The following outline is provided as an overview of and introduction to Oceanography.

What type of thing is oceanography? 
Oceanography can be described as all of the following: The study of the physical and biological aspects of the ocean

Basic oceanography concepts, processes, theories and terminology 

 Accretion (coastal management) – The process of coastal sediment returning to the visible portion of a beach
 Acoustic seabed classification – The partitioning of a seabed acoustic image into discrete physical entities or classes
 Acoustical oceanography – The use of underwater sound to study the sea, its boundaries and its contents
 Advection – The transport of a substance by bulk motion
 Ageostrophy – The real condition that works against geostrophic wind or geostrophic currents in the ocean, and works against an exact balance between the Coriolis force and the pressure gradient force
 Astrooceanography – The study of oceans outside planet Earth
 Atlantic Equatorial mode – A quasiperiodic interannual climate pattern of the equatorial Atlantic Ocean
 Baroclinity – A measure of misalignment between the gradient of pressure and the gradient of density in a fluid
 Barotropic fluid – A fluid whose density is a function of pressure only
 Barrier layer (oceanography) – A layer of water separating the well-mixed surface layer from the thermocline
 Bathometer – An instrument for measuring water depth
 Bathymetry – The study of underwater depth of lake or ocean floors
 Benthic boundary layer – The layer of water directly above the sediment at the bottom of a river, lake or sea
 Beta plane – An approximation whereby the Coriolis parameter, ƒ, is set to vary linearly in space
 Biosphere – The global sum of all ecosystems on Earth
 Bioturbation – The reworking of soils and sediments by animals or plants
 Borders of the oceans – The limits of the Earth's oceanic waters
 Bottom water – The lowermost water mass in a water body
 Brunt–Väisälä frequency – The angular frequency at which a vertically displaced parcel will oscillate within a statically stable environment
 Cabbeling – When two separate water parcels mix to form a third which is denser and sinks below both constituents
 Carbonate compensation depth – Depth in the oceans below which no calcium carbonate sediment particles are preserved
 Chemocline – A cline caused by a strong, vertical chemistry gradient within a body of water
 Climate inertia – The widespread inherent characteristic of the climate to take a considerable time to respond to a changed input
 Cold core ring – A type of oceanic eddy, characterized as unstable, time-dependent swirling ‘cells’ that separate from their respective ocean current and move into water bodies with different characteristics
 Color of water – The variability of water colour with ambient conditions
 Conservative temperature – A thermodynamic property of seawater that represents the heat content
 Coriolis frequency – Frequency of inertial oscillation at the Earth's surface resulting from the Coriolis effect
 Cum sole – A Latin phrase meaning with the sun, sometimes used in meteorology and physical oceanography to refer to anticyclonic motion
 Currentology – A science that studies the internal movements of water masses
 Deep chlorophyll maximum – A subsurface maximum in the concentration of chlorophyll in the ocean or a lake.
 Deep sea community – Groups of organisms living deep below the sea surface sharing a habitat
 Deep-sea exploration – The investigation of conditions on the sea bed, for scientific or commercial purposes
 Density ratio – A measure of the relative contributions of temperature and salinity in determining the density gradient in a seawater column
 Dynamic topography – Elevation changes caused by the flow within the Earth's mantle
 Gas hydrate stability zone – A zone and depth of the marine environment at which methane clathrates naturally exist in the Earth's crust
 Ecosystem-based management – An environmental management approach that recognizes the full array of interactions within an ecosystem
 Ekman velocity – Wind induced part of the total horizontal velocity in the upper layer of water of the open ocean such that Coriolis force is balanced by wind force
 Ferromanganese nodules – The result of ion exchange reactions that precipitate ore components from the water (sedimentary) or out of the interstitial water of the sediments layers (diagenetic).
 Geostrophic current – An oceanic flow in which the pressure gradient force is balanced by the Coriolis effect
 Geostrophic wind – The theoretical wind that would result from an exact balance between the Coriolis force and the pressure gradient force
 Hadley cell – A global scale tropical atmospheric circulation feature
 Halocline – Stratification of a body of water due to salinity differences 
 Harmful algal bloom – Population explosion of organisms that can severely lower oxygen levels in natural waters, killing marine life
 High-nutrient, low-chlorophyll regions – Regions of the ocean where the abundance of phytoplankton is low and fairly constant despite the availability of macronutrients
 Hough function – The eigenfunctions of Laplace's tidal equations which govern fluid motion on a rotating sphere
 Hydrometeorology – A branch of meteorology and hydrology that studies the transfer of water and energy between the land surface and the lower atmosphere
 Isopycnal – A line connecting points of a specific density or potential density
 Kolk (vortex) – An underwater vortex created when rapidly rushing water passes an underwater obstacle in boundary areas of high shear.(landform)
 Langmuir circulation – A series of shallow, slow, counter-rotating vortices at the ocean's surface aligned with the wind
 Lithogenic silica – Silica that originates from terrestrial sources of rock and soil
 Longshore drift – Sediment moved by the longshore current
 Lower shoreface – The portion of the seafloor, and the sedimentary depositional environment, that lies below the everyday wave base
 Lunitidal interval – The time lag from the Moon passing overhead, to the next high or low tide.
 Lysocline – Depth in the ocean below which the rate of dissolution of calcite increases dramatically
 Marine clay – A type of clay found in coastal regions around the world
 Marine debris – Human-created solid waste in the sea or ocean
 Marine energy – Energy stored in the waters of oceans
 Marine outfall – A pipeline or tunnel that discharges municipal or industrial wastewater, stormwater, combined sewer overflows, cooling water, or brine effluents from water desalination plants to the sea
 Marine pollution – 
 Marine protected area – Protected areas of seas, oceans, estuaries or large lakes
 Marine sediment – Deposits of insoluble particles that have accumulated on the seafloor. 
 Marine spatial planning – A process that brings together multiple users of the ocean – including energy, industry, government, conservation and recreation – to make informed and coordinated decisions about how to use marine resources sustainably.
 Marine technology – Technologies used in marine environments
 Maritime Continent – The region of Southeast Asia which comprises, amongst other countries, Indonesia, Philippines and Papua New Guinea
 Maritime geography – 
 Mean High Water – The average of all the high water heights observed over a period of several years
 Mean high water spring – Average level of the spring high tides over a fairly long period of time
 Mean low water spring – Average level of the spring low tides over a fairly long period of time
 Metasilicic acid – The hypothetical chemical compound with formula H2SiO3
 Metocean – The syllabic abbreviation of meteorology and (physical) oceanography.
 Microturbulence – Turbulence that varies over small distance scales
 Military meteorology – Meteorology applied to military purposes
 Mixed layer – A layer in which active turbulence has homogenized some range of depths.
 Mixing length model – A method to describe momentum transfer by turbulence Reynolds stresses within a Newtonian fluid boundary layer by means of an eddy viscosity
 Mode water – A type of water mass which is nearly vertically homogeneous
 Nepheloid layer – A layer of water in the deep ocean basin, above the ocean floor, that contains significant amounts of suspended sediment
 Neritic zone – The relatively shallow part of the ocean above the drop-off of the continental shelf
 Neutral density – A density variable used in oceanography
 New production – Marine biological processes using nutrients from outside the euphotic zone
 Ocean – A body of saline water that composes much of a planet's hydrosphere
 Ocean bank – A part of the sea which is shallow compared to its surrounding area
 Ocean color – Explanation of the colour of oceans and ocean colour radiometry
 Ocean Data Standards – 
 Ocean dredging – A technique for ocean bottom sampling
 Ocean exploration – A part of oceanography describing the exploration of ocean surfaces
 Ocean heat content – Thermal energy stored in ocean water
 Ocean observations – List of currently feasible essential observations for climate research
 Ocean surface topography – The shape of the ocean surface relative to the geoid
 Ocean turbidity – A measure of the amount of cloudiness or haziness in sea water caused by individual particles that are too small to be seen without magnification
 Ocean zoning – A policy approach for environmental resource management in oceanic environments (political)
 Oceanic physical-biological process – Hydrodynamic and hydrostatic effects on marine organisms
 Ophiolite – Uplifted and exposed oceanic crust
 Orthosilicic acid – Chemical compound assumed present in dilute solutions of silicon dioxide in water
 Phycosphere – A microscale mucus region that is rich in organic matter surrounding a phytoplankton cell
 Pierson–Moskowitz spectrum – An empirical relationship that defines the distribution of energy with frequency within the ocean
 Pockmark (geology) – Craters in the seabed caused by gas and liquids erupting and streaming through the sediments
 Potential temperature – The temperature that a fluid would attain if adiabatically brought to a standard reference pressure
 Potential vorticity – A simplified approach for understanding fluid motions in a rotating system
 Pycnocline – Layer where the density gradient is greatest within a body of water
 Region of freshwater influence – Regions where rivers debouch into estuaries and coastal shelf seas where the currents patterns are governed by density differences between salt sea water and fresh river water
 Rossby radius of deformation – The length scale at which rotational effects become as important as buoyancy or gravity wave effects in the evolution of the flow about some disturbance
 Salt fingering – A mixing process that occurs when relatively warm, salty water overlies relatively colder, fresher water
 Satellite surface salinity – Measurements of surface salinity made by remote sensing satellites
 Sea – A large body of salt water surrounded in whole or in part by land
 Sea air – Air at or by the sea
 Sea spray – Aerosol particles that are formed directly from the ocean
 Sea surface microlayer – The boundary layer where all exchange occurs between the atmosphere and the ocean
 Sea surface temperature – Water temperature close to the ocean's surface
 Seafloor massive sulfide deposits – Mineralised deposits from subsea hydrothermal vents
 Secondary circulation – A circulation induced in a rotating system
 Sediment Profile Imagery – A technique for photographing the interface between the seabed and the overlying water
 Sediment–water interface – The boundary between bed sediment and the overlying water column
 Shoal – A natural landform that rises from the bed of a body of water to near the surface and is covered by unconsolidated material
 Shore lead – A waterway opening between pack ice and shore
 Shutdown of thermohaline circulation – An effect of global warming on a major ocean circulation.
 Sigma coordinate system – A coordinate system used in computational models for oceanography, meteorology and other fields where fluid dynamics are relevant
 Significant wave height – The mean wave height of the highest third of the waves
 Siliceous ooze – A siliceous pelagic sediment that covers large areas of the deep ocean floor
 Sound (nautical) – The process of determining depth of water beneath a ship or in a tank
 Southwest Approaches – The offshore waters to the southwest of Great Britain (geographical)
 Spice (oceanography) – Spatial variations in the temperature and salinity of seawater whose effects on density cancel each other
 Spindrift – The spray foam blown from cresting waves
 Spring bloom – A strong increase in phytoplankton abundance that typically occurs in the early spring
 Submarine earthquake – An earthquake that occurs under a body of water, especially an ocean
 Submarine groundwater discharge – Flow of groundwater into the sea below sea level
 Submarine landslide – Landslides that transport sediment across the continental shelf and into the deep ocean
 Submersion (coastal management) – Sustainable cyclic portion of coastal erosion where coastal sediments move from the visible portion of a beach to the submerged nearshore region, and later return to the original visible portion of the beach
 Surface layer – The layer of a turbulent fluid most affected by interaction with a solid surface or the surface separating a gas and a liquid where the characteristics of the turbulence depend on distance from the interface
 Target strength – A measure of the reflection coefficient of a sonar target
 Taylor column – A fluid dynamics phenomenon that occurs as a result of the Coriolis effect
 Taylor–Goldstein equation – An ordinary differential equation used in the field of fluid dynamics
 Telepresence technology – The combination of satellite technology with the Internet to broadcast information, including video in real-time
 Thermocline – A distinct layer in a large body of fluid in which temperature changes more rapidly with depth than it does in the layers above or below 
 Thermostad – A homogeneous layer of oceanic waters in terms of temperature, it is defined as a relative minimum of the vertical temperature gradient
 Turbidite – The geologic deposit of a turbidity current
 Underwater – The aquatic or submarine environment
 Upper shoreface – The portion of the seafloor that is shallow enough to be agitated by everyday wave action
 Volcanic impacts on the oceans – Effects of volcanic eruptions on the marine ecosystems and climate
 Water column – A conceptual column of water from the surface to the bottom of a body of water
 Water mass – Identifiable body of water with a common formation history which has physical properties distinct from surrounding water
 Wind stress – The shear stress exerted by the wind on the surface of large bodies of water

Branches of oceanography 
 Biological oceanography – The study of how organisms affect and are affected by the physics, chemistry, and geology of the oceanographic system
 Outline of biological oceanography
 Biogeography – The study of the distribution of species and ecosystems in geographic space and through geological time
 Chemical oceanography – The study of ocean chemistry
 Geological oceanography represented by Marine geology – The study of the history and structure of the ocean floor
 Outline of marine geology – Hierarchical outline list of articles related to marine geology 
 Geophysical fluid dynamics – The fluid dynamics of naturally occurring flows, such as lava flows, oceans, and planetary atmospheres, on Earth and other planets
 Paleoceanography – The study of the history of the oceans in the geologic past
 Physical oceanography – The study of physical conditions and physical processes within the ocean
 Outline of physical oceanography – Hierarchical outline list of articles related to physical oceanography 
 Coastal morphodynamics – The study of the interaction of seafloor topography and fluid hydrodynamic processes involving the motion of sediment

Related sciences
 Climatology – The scientific study of climate, defined as weather conditions averaged over a period of time
 Outline of climatology – Hierarchical outline list of articles related to climatology
 Earth science – The fields of natural science relating to the planet Earth
 Outline of Earth sciences – Hierarchical outline list of articles related to the Earth sciences
 Portal:Earth sciences – Wikipedia's portal for exploring content related to the Earth sciences
 Ecology – Scientific study of the relationships between living organisms and their environment
 Outline of ecology – Hierarchical outline list of articles related to ecology
 Portal:Ecology – Wikipedia's portal for exploring content related to ecology
 Geography – The science that studies the terrestrial surface, the societies that inhabit it and the territories, landscapes, places or regions that form it
 Outline of geography – Hierarchical outline list of articles related to geography 
 Portal:Geography – Wikipedia's portal for exploring content related to geography
 Geology – The study of the composition, structure, physical properties, and history of Earth's components, and the processes by which they are shaped.
 Outline of geology – Hierarchical outline list of articles related to geology 
 Hydrography – Applied science of measurement and description of physical features of bodies of water
 Outline of hydrography – Hierarchical outline list of articles related to hydrography
 Hydrology – The science of the movement, distribution, and quality of water on Earth and other planets
 Outline of hydrology – Hierarchical outline list of articles related to hydrology
 Limnology – The science of inland aquatic ecosystems
 Outline of Limnology – Hierarchical outline list of articles related to limnology 
 Marine biology – The scientific study of organisms that live in the ocean
 Outline of marine biology – Hierarchical outline list of articles related to marine biology 
 Portal:Marine life – Wikipedia's portal for exploring content related to marine life
 Meteorology – Interdisciplinary scientific study of the atmosphere focusing on weather forecasting
 Outline of meteorology – Hierarchical outline list of articles related to meteorology 
 Palaeontology – Scientific study of prehistoric life
 Outline of palaeontology – Hierarchical outline list of articles related to palaeontology
 Portal:Palaeontology – Wikipedia's portal for exploring content related to palaeontology

Related technology 
 Fishing industry – The economic sector concerned with taking, culturing, processing, preserving, storing, transporting, marketing or selling fish or fish products
 Navigation – The process of monitoring and controlling the movement of a craft or vehicle from one place to another
 Offshore drilling – Mechanical process where a wellbore is drilled below the seabed
 
 Underwater diving – Descending below the surface of the water to interact with the environment
 Outline of underwater diving – Hierarchical outline list of articles related to underwater diving
 Portal:Underwater diving – Wikipedia's portal for exploring content related to underwater diving

Biological oceanography 
Biological oceanography – The study of how organisms affect and are affected by the physics, chemistry, and geology of the oceanographic system
 Algae scrubber – A biological water filter which uses light to grow algae which removes undesirable chemicals from the water
 Algal bloom – Rapid increase or accumulation in the population of planktonic algae 
 Apparent oxygen utilisation – The difference between oxygen gas solubility and the measured oxygen concentration in water with the same physical and chemical properties
 Artificial seawater – A mixture of dissolved mineral salts (and sometimes vitamins) that simulates seawater
 Bacterioplankton – The bacterial component of the plankton that drifts in the water column
 Bacterioplankton counting methods – Methods for the estimation of the abundance of bacterioplankton in a specific body of water
 Biological pump – The ocean's biologically driven sequestration of carbon from the atmosphere to deep sea water and sediment
 Biomineralization – The process by which living organisms produce minerals
 Bioturbation – The reworking of soils and sediments by animals or plants
 Blue carbon – The carbon captured by the world's oceans and coastal ecosystems
 Brown algae – A large group of multicellular algae, comprising the class Phaeophyceae
 Continental shelf pump –  Hypothetical mechanism transporting carbon from shallow continental shelf waters to the adjacent deep ocean 
 Critical depth – A hypothesized surface mixing depth at which phytoplankton growth is precisely matched by losses of phytoplankton biomass within this depth interval
 Deep chlorophyll maximum – A subsurface maximum in the concentration of chlorophyll in the ocean or a lake.
 Diatom – A class of microalgae, found in the oceans, waterways and soils of the world
 Diel vertical migration –  A pattern of daily vertical movement characteristic of many aquatic species 
 Eustigmatophyte –  A small group of algae with marine, freshwater and soil-living species 
 F-ratio – In oceanic biogeochemistry, the fraction of total primary production fuelled by nitrate
 Fish reproduction – The reproductive physiology of fishes
 Gelatinous zooplankton – Fragile and often translucent animals that live in the water column
 Heterotrophic picoplankton – The fraction of plankton composed by cells between 0.2 and 2 μm that do not perform photosynthesis
 Ichthyoplankton – The eggs and larvae of fish that drift in the water column
 Joint Global Ocean Flux Study – An international research programme on the fluxes of carbon between the atmosphere and ocean, and within the ocean interior
 List of eukaryotic picoplankton species – List of eukaryotic species which have one of their cell dimensions smaller than 3 μm
 List of marine ecoregions – As defined by the WWF and The Nature Conservancy
 Marine biogeochemical cycles – Biogeochemical cycles that occur within marine environments
 Marine biology – The scientific study of organisms that live in the ocean
 Marine botany – The study of aquatic plants and algae that live in seawater of the open ocean and the littoral zone, along shorelines of the intertidal zone, and in brackish water of estuaries.
 Marine ecosystem – Any ecosystems in the marine environment
 Marine habitats – A habitat that supports marine life
 Marine life – The plants, animals and other organisms that live in the salt water of the sea or ocean, or the brackish water of coastal estuaries
 Marine microorganisms – Any life form too small for the naked human eye to see that lives in a marine environment
 Microalgae – Microscopic algae, typically found in freshwater and marine systems, living in both the water column and sediment
 Milky seas effect – A luminous phenomenon in the ocean in which large areas of seawater appear to glow brightly enough at night to be seen by satellites orbiting Earth
 Minimum depth of occurrence – The shallowest depth in the ocean at which a species is observed
 Mycoplankton –  Fungal members of the plankton communities of aquatic ecosystems
 Ocean acidification in the Great Barrier Reef – The eggs and larvae of fish that drift in the water column 
 Photosynthetic picoplankton – 
 Phytoplankton –  Autotrophic members of the plankton ecosystem 
 Picobiliphyte – A group of eukaryotic algae which are among the smallest members of photosynthetic picoplankton.
 Picoeukaryote – Picoplanktonic eukaryotic organisms 3.0 μm or less in size
 Picoplankton – The fraction of plankton composed by cells between 0.2 and 2 μm that can be prokaryotic or eukaryotic and phototrophs or heterotrophs
 Plankton – Organisms that live in the water column and are incapable of swimming against a current
 Polar seas – A collective term for the Arctic Ocean and the southern part of the Southern Ocean
 Productivity (ecology) – The rate of generation of biomass in an ecosystem
 Project Kaisei – Project to study and clean up the Great Pacific garbage patch
 Pseudoplankton – Organisms that cannot float, but attach themselves to planktonic organisms or other floating objects
 Raphidophyte –  A class of aquatic algae 
 Red tide – A common name for a worldwide phenomenon known as an algal bloom
 Sea snot – A collection of mucus-like organic matter found in the sea
 Seston – The organisms and non-living matter swimming or floating in a water body
 Thin layers (oceanography) – Congregations of phytoplankton and zooplankton in the water column only a few tens of centimeters in vertical thickness
 Whale feces – The excrement of whales and its role in the ecology of the oceans

Marine realms 

Marine realm – Top-level grouping of marine ecoregions
 Arctic realm – Group of marine ecoregions in the Arctic zone
 Central Indo-Pacific – A biogeographic region of the Earth's seas, comprising the tropical waters of the western Pacific Ocean, the eastern Indian Ocean, and the connecting seas.
 Indo-Pacific – A biogeographic region of the Earth's seas, comprising the tropical waters of the western Pacific Ocean, the eastern Indian Ocean, and the connecting seas.
 Southern Ocean – The ocean around Antarctica
 Temperate Northern Pacific – A biogeographic region of the Earth's seas, comprising the temperate waters of the northern Pacific Ocean.
 Tropical Atlantic – Marine realm covering both sides of the Atlantic between the temperate realms
 Tropical Eastern Pacific – Marine realm covering both sides of the Atlantic between the temperate realms
 Western Indo-Pacific – A biogeographic region of the Earth's seas, comprising the tropical waters of the eastern and central Indian Ocean.

Marine ecoregions 

Marine ecoregions – Ecological regions of the oceans and seas identified and defined based on biogeographic characteristics
 List of marine ecoregions – As defined by the WWF and The Nature Conservancy
 Agulhas Current – The western boundary current of the southwest Indian Ocean that flows down the east coast of Africa
 Andaman Sea – Marginal sea of the eastern Indian Ocean
 Arabian Sea – A marginal sea of the northern Indian Ocean between the Arabian Peninsula and India
 Benguela Current – The broad, northward flowing ocean current that forms the eastern portion of the South Atlantic Ocean gyre
 Bering Sea – Marginal sea of the Pacific Ocean off the coast of Alaska, Eastern Russia and the Aleutian Islands
 Canary Current – A wind-driven surface current that is part of the North Atlantic Gyre
 Chesapeake Bay – An estuary in the U.S. states of Maryland and Virginia
 Cocos Island – An island designated as a National Park off the shore of Costa Rica
 Coral Triangle – A roughly triangular area of the tropical marine waters of Indonesia, Malaysia, Papua New Guinea, Philippines, Solomon Islands and Timor-Leste
 Grand Banks of Newfoundland – A group of underwater plateaus south-east of Newfoundland on the North American continental shelf.
 Great Barrier Reef – Coral reef system off the east coast of Australia, World Heritage Site 
 Hawkins Bank – A large, submerged bank off the Mascarene Plateau in the Indian Ocean
 Hudson Complex – A marine ecoregion in Canada, part of the Arctic marine realm
 Humboldt Current – A cold, low-salinity eastern boundary current that flows north along the western coast of South America from southern Chile to northern Peru
 Integrated Marine and Coastal Regionalisation of Australia – A biogeographic regionalisation of the oceanic waters of Australia's Exclusive Economic Zone
 Marine ecoregions of the South African exclusive economic zone – Geographical regions of similar ecological characteristics
 Mediterranean Sea – Sea connected to the Atlantic Ocean between Europe, Africa and Asia
 Mesoamerican Barrier Reef System – A marine region from Isla Contoy at the tip of the Yucatán Peninsula down to Belize, Guatemala and the Bay Islands of Honduras
 Moliço – Submerged aquatic vegetation collected for use in agriculture
 New Caledonian barrier reef – Barrier reef in the South Pacific
 Panama Bight – A marine ecoregion on the Pacific coast of the Americas
 Red Sea – Arm of the Indian Ocean between Arabia and Africa
 Ryukyu Islands – A chain of Japanese islands that stretch southwest from Kyushu to Taiwan
 Saya de Malha Bank – Submerged bank in Mauritius
 Sea ice microbial communities – Groups of microorganisms living within and at the interfaces of sea ice
 Sea of Okhotsk – A marginal sea of the western Pacific Ocean, between the Kamchatka Peninsula, the Kuril Islands, the island of Hokkaido, the island of Sakhalin, and eastern Siberian coast
 Solomon Archipelago – A marine ecoregion of the Pacific Ocean
 Somali Current – An ocean boundary current that flows along the coast of Somalia and Oman in the Western Indian Ocean
 Southeast Asian coral reefs – Marine ecosystem
 Southern California Bight – The curved coastline of Southern California from Point Conception to San Diego
 St. Crispin's Reef – An elongate outer-shelf coral reef in the Great Barrier Reef, Queensland, Australia
 Yellow Sea – Sea in Northeast Asia between China and Korea

Mangrove ecoregions 
List of mangrove ecoregions – List ordered according to region 
 Mangrove – A shrub or small tree that grows in coastal saline or brackish water
 Mangrove swamp – Saline woodland or shrubland habitat formed by mangrove trees
 Ecological values of mangroves –
 Mangrove tree distribution – Global distribution of mangroves
 Australian mangroves – Distribution of Australian mangroves
 Bahia mangroves – A tropical ecoregion of the Mangrove forests Biome, and the South American Atlantic Forest biome, located in Northeastern Brazil
 Bakhawan Eco-Park – A mangrove forest located in Kalibo, Aklan, Philippines
 Belizean Coast mangroves – Ecoregion in the mangrove biome along the coast of Belize and Amatique Bay in Guatemala
 Bhitarkanika Mangroves – A mangrove wetland in India's Odisha state, in the river delta of the Brahmani and Baitarani rivers
 Bongsanglay Natural Park – A protected area of mangrove forests and swamps on Ticao Island in the Bicol Region of the Philippines
 Myanmar Coast mangroves – An ecoregion in Burma, Malaysia, and Thailand where there were once thick forests of mangroves
 Caroni Swamp – The second largest mangrove wetland in Trinidad and Tobago
 Central African mangroves – The largest area of mangrove swamp in Africa, located on the coasts of West Africa, mainly in Nigeria
 East African mangroves – An ecoregion of mangrove swamps along the Indian Ocean coast of East Africa in Mozambique, Tanzania, Kenya and southern Somalia
 Esmeraldas–Pacific Colombia mangroves – An ecoregion of mangrove forests along the Pacific coast of Colombia and Ecuador.
 Florida mangroves – An ecoregion along the coasts of the Florida peninsula, and the Florida Keys
 Godavari–Krishna mangroves – A mangrove ecoregion of India's eastern coast
 Greater Antilles mangroves – Mangrove forests on the coast of Cuba
 Guianan mangroves – A coastal ecoregion of southeastern Venezuela, Guyana, Suriname and French Guiana
 Guinean mangroves – A coastal ecoregion of mangrove swamps in rivers and estuaries near the ocean of West Africa from Senegal to Sierra Leone
 Gulf of Guayaquil–Tumbes mangroves – An ecoregion in the Gulf of Guayaquil in South America, in northern Peru and southern Ecuador
 Gulf of Panama mangroves – An ecoregion along the Pacific coast of Panama and Colombia
 Indochina mangroves – A large mangrove ecoregion on the coasts of Thailand, Cambodia, Vietnam and Malaysia in Southeast Asia
 Indus River Delta–Arabian Sea mangroves – A large mangrove ecoregion on the Arabian Sea coast of Sindh Province, Pakistan
 Jiwani Coastal Wetland – A wetland located in Balochistan, Pakistan, near the town of Jiwani
 Laguna de Términos – The largest and one of biologically the richest tidal lagoons located entirely on the Gulf Coast of Mexico
 Madagascar mangroves – A coastal ecoregion in the mangrove forest biome found on the west coast of Madagascar
 Manabí mangroves – An ecoregion along the Pacific coast of Ecuador
 Maranhão mangroves – A mangrove ecoregion of northern Brazil
 Marismas Nacionales–San Blas mangroves – A mangrove ecoregion of the Pacific coast of Mexico
 Mosquitia–Nicaraguan Caribbean Coast mangroves – An ecoregion, in the Mangrove biome, along the Caribbean coasts of Nicaragua, Honduras, Costa Rica and off shore islands
 Nariva Swamp – A freshwater wetland in Trinidad and Tobago
 New Guinea mangroves – A freshwater wetland in Trinidad and Tobago
 Niger Delta mangroves – A mangrove forest within a deltaic depositional environment
 Northern Honduras mangroves – An ecoregion in the mangroves biome, along most of the Caribbean coast of Honduras, up to the east of Amatique Bay in Guatemala
 Sarovaram Bio Park – Project with an eco-friendly theme and in an ecosystem of wetlands and mangrove forests containing bird habitats
 South American Pacific mangroves – An ecoregion along the Pacific coast of Panama, Colombia, Ecuador and Peru
 Southern Africa mangroves – An ecoregion of mangrove swamps in rivers and estuaries on the eastern coast of South Africa
 Sunda Shelf mangroves – An ecoregion of mangrove swamps in rivers and estuaries on the eastern coast of South Africa
 Sundarbans – The world's largest coastal mangrove forest in the delta region of Padma, Meghna and Brahmaputra river basins in the Bay of Bengal
 Tropical salt pond ecosystem – A buffer zone between terrestrial and marine ecosystems
 United States Virgin Islands Mangroves – Wetlands on the coast of the US Virgin Islands

Chemical oceanography 
Chemical oceanography – The study of ocean chemistry
 Alkalinity – The capacity of water to resist changes in pH that would make the water more acidic
 Anoxic event – Intervals in the Earth's past where parts of oceans were depleted of oxygen at depth over a large geographic area
 Anoxic waters – Areas of sea water, fresh water, or groundwater that are depleted of dissolved oxygen
 Artificial seawater – A mixture of dissolved mineral salts (and sometimes vitamins) that simulates seawater
 Biogeochemistry – The study of chemical cycles of the earth that are either driven by or influence biological activity
 Biological pump – The ocean's biologically driven sequestration of carbon from the atmosphere to deep sea water and sediment
 Bjerrum plot – A graph of the concentrations of the different species of a polyprotic acid in a solution, as functions of the solution's pH, when the solution is at equilibrium
 Blue carbon – The carbon captured by the world's oceans and coastal ecosystems
 Brine rejection – Process by which salts are expelled from freezing water
 Carbon cycle – Biogeochemical cycle by which carbon is exchanged among the biosphere, pedosphere, geosphere, hydrosphere, and atmosphere,
 Carbon cycle re-balancing – A name for a group of environmental policies
 Carbonaceous biochemical oxygen demand – A test measured by the depletion of dissolved oxygen by biological organisms in a body of water
 Chemical oxygen demand – Measure of the amount of oxygen that can be consumed by reactions in a solution
 Climate change – Change in the statistical distribution of weather patterns for an extended period
 Cold blob (North Atlantic) – A cold temperature anomaly of ocean surface waters, affecting the Atlantic Meridional Overturning Circulation
 Colored dissolved organic matter – The optically measurable component of the dissolved organic matter in water
 Continental shelf pump – Hypothetical mechanism transporting carbon from surface waters to the adjacent deep ocean.
 Cyclic salt – Salt carried by the wind from breaking waves and deposited on land
 Dead zone (ecology) – Hypoxic areas in oceans and large lakes caused by excessive nutrient pollution
 Euxinia – Condition when water is both anoxic and sulfidic
 F-ratio – In oceanic biogeochemistry, the fraction of total primary production fuelled by nitrate
 Gaia hypothesis – 
 Global Ocean Data Analysis Project – A synthesis project bringing together oceanographic data
 Hydrogen isotope biogeochemistry – 
 Hypoxia (environmental) – Low environmental oxygen levels
 Hypoxia in fish – Response of fish to environmental hypoxia
 Ocean acidification in the Great Barrier Reef – 
 Jelly-falls – Marine carbon cycling events whereby gelatinous zooplankton sink to the seafloor
 Marine snow – Shower of mostly organic detritus falling from the upper layers of the water column
 New production – Marine biological processes using nutrients from outside the euphotic zone
 Nutrient – Substance that an organism uses to live
 Ocean acidification – The ongoing decrease in the pH of the Earth's oceans, caused by the uptake of carbon dioxide
 Ocean chemistry – The chemistry of marine environments
 Oceanic carbon cycle – Processes that exchange carbon between various pools within the ocean and the atmosphere, Earth interior, and the seafloor
 Oligosaprobe – Organisms that inhabit clean water or water that is only slightly polluted by organic matter.
 Silicon isotope biogeochemistry – 
 Oxygen cycle – The biogeochemical cycle of oxygen within its four main reservoirs: the atmosphere, the biosphere, the hydrosphere, and the lithosphere
 Oxygen minimum zone – The zone in which oxygen saturation in seawater in the ocean is at its lowest
 Paleosalinity – The salinity of the global ocean or of an ocean basin at a point in geological history.
 Productivity (ecology) – The rate of generation of biomass in an ecosystem
 Redox gradient – 
 Remineralisation – 
 Salinity – The proportion of salt dissolved in a body of water
 Sea foam – Foam created by the agitation of seawater
 Sea salt – Salt produced from the evaporation of seawater
 Sea salt aerosol – Natural aerosol deriving from sea spray
 Seawater – Water from a sea or ocean
 Sel gris – A coarse granular sea salt evaporite
 Solubility pump – A physico-chemical process that transports dissolved inorganic carbon from the ocean's surface to its interior
 Submarine groundwater discharge – 
 Thermohaline circulation – A part of the large-scale ocean circulation that is driven by global density gradients created by surface heat and freshwater fluxes
 Total boron – The sum of boron species in a solution
 Total carbon – The sum of carbon species in a solution
 Total organic carbon – The sum of organic carbon species in a solution
 Dissolved organic carbon – The fraction of dissolved organic carbon in a solution
 Particulate organic carbon – The fraction of particulate organic carbon in a solution 
 Total inorganic carbon – The sum of inorganic carbon species in a solution
 Dissolved inorganic carbon –  The fraction of dissolved inorganic carbon in a solution
 Particulate inorganic carbon –  The fraction of particulate inorganic carbon in a solution
 Water mass – Identifiable body of water with a common formation history which has physical properties distinct from surrounding water
 Antarctic bottom water – A cold, dense, water mass originating in the Southern Ocean surrounding Antarctica
 Antarctic Intermediate Water – A cold, relatively low salinity water mass found mostly at intermediate depths in the Southern Ocean
 Circumpolar deep water – The water mass in the Pacific and Indian oceans formed by mixing of other water masses in the region
 North Atlantic Deep Water – A deep water mass formed in the North Atlantic Ocean
 North Pacific Intermediate Water – A cold, moderately low salinity water mass that originates between the Kuroshio and Oyashio waters just east of Japan
 Overturning in the Subpolar North Atlantic Program – An international project to study the link between water mass transformation at high latitudes and the meridional overturning circulation in the North Atlantic
 Subantarctic Mode Water – A water mass formed near the Subantarctic Front on the northern flank of the Antarctic Circumpolar Current 
 Temperature–salinity diagram – Diagrams used to identify water masses
 Weddell Sea Bottom Water – A subset of Antarctic Bottom Water mass that is at -0.7 °C or colder

Equipment, instrumentation and technologies 

 ABISMO – A Japanese remotely operated underwater vehicle for deep sea exploration
 Acoustic Doppler current profiler – A hydroacoustic current meter used to measure water current velocities over a depth range using the Doppler effect
 Acoustic release – An oceanographic device for the deployment and subsequent recovery of instrumentation from the sea floor, in which the recovery is triggered remotely by an acoustic command signal
 Acoustically Navigated Geological Underwater Survey – A deep-towed still-camera sled operated by the Woods Hole Oceanographic Institute in the early 1970s
 Aquarius (SAC-D instrument) – NASA instrument aboard the Argentine SAC-D spacecraft
 Aquarius Reef Base – An underwater habitat off Key Largo in the Florida Keys National Marine Sanctuary
 Argo (ROV) – Unmanned deep-towed undersea video camera sled
 DSV Alvin – A manned deep-ocean research submersible owned by the United States Navy and operated by the Woods Hole Oceanographic Institution
 Bathythermograph – Device that holds a temperature sensor and a transducer to detect changes in water temperature versus depth
 Benthic lander – Autonomous observational platforms that sit on the seabed to record physical, chemical or biological activity
 Bottom crawler – An underwater exploration and recovery vehicle that moves about on the bottom with wheels or tracks
 Box corer – A marine geological sampling tool for soft sediments
 Cabled observatory – Seabed oceanographic research platforms connected to the surface by undersea cables
 Coastal zone color scanner – A multi-channel scanning radiometer aboard the Nimbus 7 satellite, predominately designed for water remote sensing
 CTD (instrument) – An oceanography instrument used to measure the conductivity, temperature, and pressure of seawater
 Current meter – A device for measuring the flow in a water current
 Deep-ocean Assessment and Reporting of Tsunamis – A component of an enhanced tsunami warning system
 Deepsea Challenger – Deep-diving submersible designed to reach the bottom of Challenger Deep
 Drifter (floating device) – An oceanographic instrument package floating freely on the surface to investigate ocean currents and other parameters like temperature or salinity
 Echo sounding – Measuring the depth of water by transmitting sound waves into water and timing the return
 Ekman current meter – A mechanical flowmeter invented by Vagn Walfrid Ekman, a Swedish oceanographer, in 1903
 Ekman water bottle – A sea water temperature sample device
 Epibenthic sled – An instrument designed to collect benthic and benthopelagic faunas from the deep sea
 Fixed-point ocean observatory – An autonomous system of automatic sensors and samplers that continuously gathers data from deep sea, water column and lower atmosphere, and transmits the data to shore in real or near real-time
 Float (oceanographic instrument platform) – An oceanographic instrument platform used for making subsurface measurements in the ocean
 Flow tracer – Any fluid property used to track flow
 Forel-Ule scale – A method to approximately determine the color of bodies of water using a standard colour scale
 Friendly Floatees – Plastic bath toys made famous by the work of Curtis Ebbesmeyer, an oceanographer who models ocean currents on the basis of flotsam movements.
 GLORIA sidescan sonar – Geological Long Range Inclined Asdic for determining the topography of the ocean floor
 Hansa Carrier – Container ship which lost a cargo of identifiable shoes which were used to record ocean drift
 High capacity oceanographic lithium battery pack – A type of battery pack used by oceanographers
 Kaikō ROV – A Japanese remotely operated underwater vehicle for deep sea exploration
 LEBU – A device to reduce noise around a towed acoustic array
 Long baseline acoustic positioning system – Class of underwater acoustic positioning systems used to track underwater vehicles and divers
 Manta trawl – A net system for sampling the surface of the ocean
 Marine optical buoy – Instrumentation that measures light at and very near the sea surface in a specific location over a long period of time
 Message in a bottle – A form of communication in which a written message sealed in a container is released into the conveyance medium
 Mooring – A collection of devices, connected to a wire and anchored on the sea floor
 Multibeam echosounder – A type of sonar that is used to map the seabed
 Nansen bottle – Device for obtaining samples of seawater at a specific depth
 Ocean data acquisition system – A set of instruments deployed at sea to collect as much meteorological and oceanographic data as possible.
 PERISCOP – A pressurized recovery device designed for retrieving deep-sea marine life
 Prediction and Research Moored Array in the Atlantic – A system of moored observation buoys in the tropical Atlantic Ocean which collect meteorological and oceanographic data
 RAFOS float – Submersible device used to map ocean currents well below the surface
 Regional Scale Nodes – An electro-optically cabled underwater observatory that directly connects to the global Internet
 Research Moored Array for African-Asian-Australian Monsoon Analysis and Prediction – A system of moored observation buoys in the Indian Ocean that collects meteorological and oceanographic data
 Rotor current meter – A mechanical current meter used in oceanography to measure flow
 Science On a Sphere – A spherical projection system created by NOAA which presents high-resolution video on a suspended globe
 SeaWiFS – A satellite-borne sensor designed to collect global ocean biological data
 Secchi disk – A circular disk used to measure water transparency or turbidity
 Sediment trap – Instrument used in oceanography to measure the quantity of sinking particulate material
 Short baseline acoustic positioning system – A class of underwater acoustic positioning systems used to track underwater vehicles and divers
 Sofar bomb – A long-range position-fixing system that uses explosive sounds in the deep sound channel of the ocean to enable pinpointing of the location of ships or crashed planes
 SOSUS – A chain of underwater listening posts
 Tide gauge – A device for measuring the change in sea level relative to a datum
 Underwater acoustic positioning system – A system for the tracking and navigation of underwater vehicles or divers by using acoustic distance and/or direction measurements, and subsequent position triangulation
 Underwater glider – A type of autonomous underwater vehicle that uses small changes in its buoyancy to move up and down and uses wings to convert the vertical motion to horizontal, propelling itself forward with very low power consumption
 Unmanned surface vehicle – Vehicle that operates on the surface of the water without a crew
 Van Veen grab sampler – An instrument to sample sediment in water environments
 Vector measuring current meter – An instrument used for measuring horizontal velocity in the upper ocean
 Water remote sensing – System to measure the color of water by observing the spectrum of radiation leaving the water.
 Weather buoy – Floating instrument package which collects weather and ocean data on the world's oceans
 Young grab – An instrument to sample sediment in the ocean

Research vessels 
Research vessel – A ship or boat designed, modified, or equipped to carry out research at sea
 RRS Charles Darwin – A Royal Research Ship belonging to the British Natural Environment Research Council. Since 2006, she has been the geophysical survey vessel, RV Ocean Researcher
 RRS Sir David Attenborough
 RRS Discovery (2012) – A Royal Research Ship operated by the Natural Environment Research Council
 RRS Ernest Shackleton
 RRS James Cook – A British Royal Research Ship operated by the Natural Environment Research Council
 RRS John Biscoe (1956) – A supply and research vessel used by the British Antarctic Survey between 1956 and 1991
 NOAAS Murre II – An American research vessel in commission in the National Oceanic and Atmospheric Administration (NOAA) fleet from 1970 to 1989
 NOAAS Okeanos Explorer – An exploratory vessel for the National Oceanic and Atmospheric Administration
 MS Polarfront – A Norwegian weather ship located in the North Atlantic
  – An oceanographic survey ship from 1948 to 1970
 USNS Robert D. Conrad (T-AGOR-3) – Oceanographic research ship that served the U.S. Navy from 1962 to 1989
 RV Song of the Whale – A research vessel owned by Marine Conservation Research International
 RV Noosfera – A supply and research ship operated by the 	National Antarctic Scientific Center of Ukraine

Satellites 
 GEOS-3 – The third and final satellite of NASA's Geodetic Earth Orbiting Satellite/Geodynamics Experimental Ocean Satellite program
 Jason-1 – Satellite oceanography mission
 Jason-2 (Ocean Surface Topography Mission) – International Earth observation satellite mission
 Jason-3 – International Earth observation satellite mission
 Oceansat-1 – The first Indian satellite built specifically for Ocean applications
 Oceansat-2 – An Indian satellite to provide service continuity for users of the Ocean Colour Monitor instrument on Oceansat-1
 QuikSCAT – An Earth observation satellite carrying the SeaWinds scatterometer to measure the surface wind speed and direction over the ice-free global oceans

Technologies 
 Free Ocean CO2 Enrichment –
 Integrated multi-trophic aquaculture – Aquaculture which provides the byproducts, including waste, from one aquatic species as inputs for another
 Ocean acoustic tomography – A technique used to measure temperatures and currents over large regions of the ocean
 Ocean thermal energy conversion – Use of temperature difference between surface and deep water to run a heat engine
 Ocean reanalysis – A method of combining historical ocean observations with a general ocean model to reconstruct a historical state of the ocean
 Offshore geotechnical engineering – A sub-field of engineering concerned with human-made structures in the sea
 Submarine pipeline – A pipeline that is laid on the seabed or below it inside a trench
 Subsea production system – Wells located on the seabed
 Underwater diving – Descending below the surface of the water to interact with the environment
 Vacuum-anchor – Ocean bottom fasteners used to anchor deepwater oil platforms
 Vienna Standard Mean Ocean Water – A standard defining the isotopic composition of fresh water originating from ocean water
 Water quality modelling – The prediction of water pollution using mathematical simulation techniques

Geological oceanography 
(Outline of Marine geology – Hierarchical outline list of articles on marine geology)

Marine geology – The study of the history and structure of the ocean floor
 Abyssal channel – Channels in the sea floor formed by fast-flowing turbidity currents
 Accretionary complex — A former accretionary wedge
 Accretionary wedge – The sediments accreted onto the non-subducting tectonic plate at a convergent plate boundary
 Aragonite sea – Chemical conditions of the sea favouring aragonite deposition
 Astoria Fan – A submarine fan radiating asymmetrically southward from the mouth of the Astoria Canyon
 Back-arc basin – Submarine features associated with island arcs and subduction zones
 Blake Plateau – A wide shelf, deeper than the continental shelf, in the western Atlantic Ocean off the southeastern United States
 Blue hole – Marine cavern or sinkhole, open to the surface, in carbonate bedrock
 Dean's Blue Hole – A deep water-filled sinkhole in the Bahamas
 Dragon Hole – Deep underwater sinkhole in the South China Sea
 Calcite sea – Sea chemistry favouring low-magnesium calcite as the inorganic calcium carbonate precipitate
 Carbonate platform – A sedimentary body with topographic relief composed of autochthonous calcareous deposits
 Cascadia Channel – An extensive deep-sea channel of the Pacific Ocean.
 Chukchi Sea Shelf – The westernmost part of the continental shelf of North America and the easternmost part of the continental shelf of Asia.
 Cold seep – Ocean floor area where hydrogen sulfide, methane and other hydrocarbon-rich fluid seepage occurs
 Forearc – The region between an oceanic trench and the associated volcanic arc
 Fundus (seabed) – The seabed in a tidal river below low water mark
 Hawaiian Trough – A moat-like depression of the seafloor surrounding the Hawaiian Islands
 Hope Basin – A geological feature of the Chukchi Sea Shelf off Alaska
 Intra-arc basin – A sedimentary basin within a volcanic arc
 Juan de Fuca Channel – A submarine channel off the shore of Washington state
 List of submarine topographical features – Oceanic landforms and topographic elements.
 Marine geology of the Cape Peninsula and False Bay – Subtidal geological formations in the vicinity of Cape Town
 Paleoceanography – The study of the history of the oceans in the geologic past
 Pelagic red clay – Slow accumulating oceanic sediment with low biogenic constituents
 Pelagic sediment – Fine-grained sediment that accumulates on the floor of the open ocean
 Porcupine Seabight – A deep-water oceanic basin on the continental margin of the northeastern Atlantic
 Rio Grande Rise – An aseismic ocean ridge in the southern Atlantic Ocean off the coast of Brazil 
 Sapropel – Dark-coloured sediments that are rich in organic matter
 Terrigenous sediment – Sediments derived from the erosion of rocks on land

Fracture zones 
Fracture zone – A junction between oceanic crustal regions of different ages on the same plate left by a transform fault
 List of fracture zones – List of seabed zones where divergent plates have had transform faults
 Blanco Fracture Zone – A right lateral transform fault zone between the Gorda Ridge and the Juan de Fuca Ridge in the northwest Pacific
 Charlie-Gibbs Fracture Zone – a system of two parallel fracture zones interrupting the Mid-Atlantic Ridge between the Azores and Iceland
 Chile Fracture Zone – A major strike slip fault and fracture zone on the Antarctic—Nazca Plate boundary
 Clipperton Fracture Zone – A fracture zone of the Pacific Ocean seabed
 Diamantina Fracture Zone – An escarpment, separating two oceanic plateaus in the southeast Indian Ocean
 Easter Fracture Zone – An oceanic fracture zone associated with the transform fault from the Tuamotu archipelago to the Peru–Chile Trench
 Fifteen-Twenty Fracture Zone – A fracture zone on the Mid-Atlantic Ridge at the migrating triple junction between the North American, South American, and Nubian plates
 Mendocino Fracture Zone – A fracture zone and transform boundary off the coast of Cape Mendocino in far northern California
 Mocha Fracture Zone – A fracture zone on the Nazca Plate off the coast of Mocha Island,
 Owen Fracture Zone – A transform fault in the northwest Indian Ocean between the Arabian and African Plates from the Indian Plate
 Panama Fracture Zone – A right lateral-moving transform fault and fracture zone between the Cocos Plate and the Nazca Plate
 Romanche Trench – A trench in the Atlantic formed by the Romanche fracture zone on the Mid-Atlantic Ridge
 Shackleton Fracture Zone – An undersea fracture zone and fault in the Drake Passage between the Scotia and Antarctic Plates
 Sovanco Fracture Zone – A right lateral-moving transform fault and fracture zone offshore of Vancouver Island in Canada
 Valdivia Fracture Zone – A transform fault zone off the coast of southern Chile
 Vema Fracture Zone – A fracture zone in the equatorial Atlantic Ocean. It offsets the Mid-Atlantic Ridge by 320 km to the left.

Geology of the North Sea 
Geology of the North Sea – Description of the current geological features and the geological history that created them
 Doggerland – A land mass now beneath the southern North Sea that connected Great Britain to continental Europe
 Eridanos (geology) – A river that flowed where the Baltic Sea is now
 Geology of the southern North Sea – 
 Haisborough Group – A Triassic lithostratigraphic group beneath the southern part of the North Sea
 Heron Group – A Triassic alluvial lithostratigraphic group beneath the central and northern North Sea 
 Lower North Sea Group – A group of geologic formations in the subsurface of the Netherlands and adjacent parts of the North Sea.
 North German basin – A passive-active rift basin in central and west Europe
 Norwegian continental shelf – Norwegian administrative area, rich in petroleum and gas
 Strandflat – A landform typical of the Norwegian coast consisting of a flattish erosion surface on the coast and near-coast seabed
 Utsira High – A basement high and horst in the southwest of the Norwegian continental shelf

New Zealand seafloor 
New Zealand seafloor – The topography and geography of the seafloor in New Zealand's territorial waters. 
 2012 Kermadec Islands eruption – A major undersea volcanic eruption in the Kermadec Islands of New Zealand
 Bollons Seamount – A continental fragment seamount southeast of New Zealand
 Bounty Trough – A depression in the submerged eastern part of Zealandia
 Brothers Volcano – A submarine volcano in the Kermadec Arc, north east of New Zealand
 Campbell Plateau – A large oceanic plateau south of New Zealand and the Chatham Rise
 Challenger Plateau – A large submarine plateau west of New Zealand and south of the Lord Howe Rise
 Chatham Rise – An area of ocean floor to the east of New Zealand, forming part of the Zealandia continent
 Great South Basin – An area of mainly sea to the south of the South Island of New Zealand
 Healy (volcano) – Submarine volcano in New Zealand's Kermadec Islands
 Hikurangi Margin – Subduction zone off the east coast of New Zealand's North Island
 Hikurangi Plateau – An oceanic plateau in the South Pacific east of the North Island of New Zealand
 Hikurangi Trench – An oceanic trench in the bed of the Pacific off the east coast of the North Island of New Zealand
 Kermadec Plate – A long, narrow tectonic plate west of the Kermadec Trench
 Kermadec Trench – A linear ocean trench in the south Pacific north west of New Zealand
 Maari oil field – An oilfield off the coast of South Taranaki, New Zealand
 Mahuika crater – A submarine feature of the New Zealand continental shelf hypothesized to be an extraterrestrial impact crater
 Maui gas field – The largest gas, natural gas condensate and oil field in New Zealand
 Monowai Seamount – A volcanic seamount to the north of New Zealand in the Kermadec arc
 Norfolk Ridge – A submarine ridge between New Caledonia and New Zealand
 Pohokura field – An oil and gas field offshore of north Taranaki in New Zealand
 Puysegur Trench – A deep cleft in the floor of the south Tasman Sea south of New Zealand's South Island
 Tonga-Kermadec Ridge – An oceanic ridge in the south-west Pacific Ocean underlying the Tonga-Kermadec island arc
 Zealandia – Mostly submerged mass of continental crust containing New Zealand and New Caledonia
 Oceanic basin – Large geologic basins that are below sea level

Oceanic ridges 
 Central Basin Spreading Center – A seafloor spreading center of the West Philippine Sea Basin (geology)
 Mid-ocean ridge – An underwater mountain system formed by plate tectonic spreading
 List of submarine topographical features – Oceanic landforms and topographic elements.
 Oceanic core complex – A seabed geologic feature that forms a long ridge perpendicular to a mid-ocean ridge
 Overlapping spreading centers – A feature of spreading centers at mid-ocean ridges
 Propagating rift – A seafloor feature associated with spreading centers at mid-ocean ridges and back-arc basins
 Oceanic ridges of the Arctic Ocean – 
 Alpha Ridge – A major volcanic ridge under the Arctic Ocean
 Chukchi Cap represented by Chukchi Plateau – A large subsea formation extending north from the Alaskan margin into the Arctic Ocean
 Gakkel Ridge – A mid-oceanic ridge under the Arctic Ocean between the North American Plate and the Eurasian Plate
 Lomonosov Ridge – An underwater ridge of continental crust in the Arctic Ocean
 Mendeleev Ridge – A broad ridge in the Arctic Ocean from the Siberian Shelf to the central areas of the ocean
 Oceanic ridges of the Atlantic Ocean – 
 Aegir Ridge – An extinct mid-ocean ridge in the far-northern Atlantic Ocean
 South American–Antarctic Ridge – Mid-ocean ridge in the South Atlantic between the South American Plate and the Antarctic Plate
 Aves Ridge – A ridge in the eastern Caribbean Sea west of the Lesser Antilles Volcanic Arc
 Cayman Ridge – A ridge in the eastern Caribbean Sea west of the Lesser Antilles Volcanic Arc
 J-Anomaly Ridge – A ridge in the North Atlantic Ocean southeast of the Grand Banks of Newfoundland
 Kings Trough – An undersea trough in the Atlantic Ocean on the east side of the Mid-Atlantic Ridge, northwest of the Açores-Biscay rise
 Kolbeinsey Ridge – A segment of the Mid-Atlantic Ridge north of Iceland in the Arctic Ocean
 Mid-Atlantic Ridge – A divergent tectonic plate boundary that in the North Atlantic separates the Eurasian and North American Plates, and in the South Atlantic separates the African and South American Plates
 Rio Grande Rise – An aseismic ocean ridge in the southern Atlantic Ocean off the coast of Brazil
 Southwest Indian Ridge – A mid-ocean ridge on the bed of the south-west Indian Ocean and south-east Atlantic Ocean
 Walvis Ridge – An aseismic ocean ridge in the southern Atlantic Ocean.
 Wyville Thomson Ridge – A feature of the North Atlantic Ocean floor between the Faroe Islands and Scotland
 Oceanic ridges of the Indian Ocean – 
 Aden Ridge – Part of an active oblique rift system in the Gulf of Aden, between Somalia and the Arabian Peninsula
 Carlsberg Ridge – The northern section of the Central Indian Ridge between the African Plate and the Indo-Australian Plate
 Central Indian Ridge – A north-south-trending mid-ocean ridge in the western Indian Ocean
 Chagos–Laccadive Ridge – A volcanic ridge and oceanic plateau between the Northern and the Central Indian Ocean.
 Eighty Five East Ridge – A near-linear, aseismic, age-progressive ridge in the northeastern Indian Ocean.
 Ninety East Ridge – a linear ridge on the Indian Ocean floor near the 90th meridian
 Southeast Indian Ridge – A mid-ocean ridge in the southern Indian Ocean
 Southwest Indian Ridge – A mid-ocean ridge on the bed of the south-west Indian Ocean and south-east Atlantic Ocean
 Oceanic ridges of the Pacific Ocean – 
 Bowers Ridge – A currently seismically inactive ridge in the southern part of the Aleutian Basin
 Carnegie Ridge – An aseismic ridge on the Nazca Plate that is being subducted beneath the South American Plate
 Chile Rise – An oceanic ridge at the tectonic divergent plate boundary between the Nazca and Antarctic Plates
 D'Entrecasteaux Ridge – A double oceanic ridge in the south-west Pacific Ocean, north of New Caledonia and west of Vanuatu Islands
 Darwin Rise – A broad triangular region in the north central Pacific Ocean where there is a concentration of atolls
 East Pacific Rise – A mid-oceanic ridge at a divergent tectonic plate boundary on the floor of the Pacific Ocean
 East Tasman Plateau – A submerged microcontinent south east of Tasmania
 Explorer Ridge – A mid-ocean ridge west of British Columbia, Canada
 Galápagos Rise – A divergent boundary between the South American coast and the triple junction of the Nazca Plate, the Cocos Plate, and the Pacific Plate
 Gorda Ridge – A tectonic spreading center off the northern coast of California and southern Oregon
 Juan de Fuca Ridge – A tectonic spreading center off the northern coast of California and southern Oregon
 Juan Fernández Ridge – A volcanic island and seamount chain on the Nazca Plate
 Kula-Farallon Ridge – An ancient mid-ocean ridge that existed between the Kula and Farallon plates in the Pacific Ocean during the Jurassic period
 Lord Howe Rise – A deep sea plateau from south west of New Caledonia to the Challenger Plateau, west of New Zealand
 Macquarie Fault Zone – A transform fault on the seafloor of the south Pacific Ocean from New Zealand southwestward to the Macquarie Triple Junction
 Magellan Rise (ocean plateau) – An oceanic plateau in the Pacific Ocean
 Mid-Pacific Mountains – An underwater mountain range from the southern tier of the Japan Trench to the Hawaiian Islands
 Nazca Ridge – A submarine ridge on the Nazca Plate off the west coast of South America
 Norfolk Ridge – A submarine ridge between New Caledonia and New Zealand
 Pacific–Antarctic Ridge – A divergent tectonic plate boundary located on the seafloor of the South Pacific Ocean, separating the Pacific Plate from the Antarctic Plate
 Pacific-Farallon Ridge – A spreading ridge during the late Cretaceous that separated the Pacific Plate to the west and the Farallon Plate to the east
 Pacific-Kula Ridge – A mid-ocean ridge between the Pacific and Kula plates in the Pacific Ocean during the Paleogene period
 Phoenix Ridge – An ancient mid-ocean ridge between the Phoenix and Pacific Plates
 Researcher Ridge – A series of seamounts in the Atlantic Ocean
 Shirshov Ridge – Seabed ridge on the eastern border of the Commander Basin below the Kamchatka Peninsula
 Tehuantepec Ridge – A linear undersea ridge off the west coast of Mexico in the Pacific Ocean. It is the remnant of an old fracture zone
 Tonga-Kermadec Ridge – An oceanic ridge in the south-west Pacific Ocean underlying the Tonga-Kermadec island arc
 Oceanic ridges of the Southern Ocean – 
 South American–Antarctic Ridge – Mid-ocean ridge in the South Atlantic between the South American Plate and the Antarctic Plate
 Ligeti Ridge – An undersea ridge in the Southern Ocean (Edit)
 Maud Rise – An oceanic plateau in the Southern Ocean
 Pacific–Antarctic Ridge – A divergent tectonic plate boundary located on the seafloor of the South Pacific Ocean, separating the Pacific Plate from the Antarctic Plate
 Phoenix Ridge – An ancient mid-ocean ridge between the Phoenix and Pacific plates
 South Tasman Rise – An area of seafloor about 1500 m deep south of Hobart, Tasmania in the Southern Ocean
 Southwest Indian Ridge – A mid-ocean ridge on the bed of the south-west Indian Ocean and south-east Atlantic Ocean
 Ridge volcanoes – 
 Axial Seamount – A submarine volcano on the Juan de Fuca Ridge west of Oregon
 Beerenberg – A volcano on Jan Mayen island
 Bouvet Island – Uninhabited subantarctic volcanic island
 Bowie Seamount –  Submarine volcano in the northeastern Pacific Ocean 
 Jan Mayen – Norwegian volcanic island situated in the Arctic Ocean
 President Jackson Seamounts – A series of seamounts on the Pacific Plate off California
 Prince Edward Islands – Two small sub-Antarctic islands belonging to South Africa
 Tuzo Wilson Seamounts – Two active submarine volcanoes off the coast of British Columbia, Canada
 Vance Seamounts – A group of seven submarine volcanoes located west of the Juan de Fuca Ridge

Oceanic trenches 
Oceanic trench – the deepest parts of the ocean floor, typically formed when one tectonic plate slides under another.
 Oceanic trenches of the Arctic Ocean:
 Litke Deep – An oceanic trench in the Arctic Ocean
 Molloy Deep – The deepest trench in the Arctic Ocean
 Oceanic trenches of the Atlantic Ocean
 Cayman Trough – A complex transform fault zone pull-apart basin on the floor of the western Caribbean Sea
 Devil's Hole (North Sea) – A group of deep trenches in the North Sea east of Dundee, Scotland
 The Gully (Atlantic) – An underwater canyon in the Atlantic Ocean east of Nova Scotia
 Hellenic Trench – A long narrow depression in the Ionian Sea
 Kings Trough – An undersea trough in the Atlantic Ocean on the east side of the Mid-Atlantic Ridge, northwest of the Açores-Biscay rise
 Milwaukee Deep – The deepest part of the Atlantic Ocean – part of the Puerto Rico Trench
 Norwegian trench – An elongated depression in the sea floor off the southern coast of Norway
 Puerto Rico Trench – An oceanic trench on a transform boundary between the Caribbean and North American Plates
 Romanche Trench – A trench in the Atlantic formed by the Romanche fracture zone on the Mid-Atlantic Ridge
 South Sandwich Trench – A deep arcuate trench in the South Atlantic Ocean east of the South Sandwich Islands
 Tongue of the Ocean – A deep oceanic trench in the Bahamas between Andros and New Providence islands
 Oceanic trenches of the Indian Ocean   
 Diamantina Deep – Part of the Diamantina Trench southwest of Perth, Western Australia
 Diamantina Fracture Zone – An escarpment, separating two oceanic plateaus in the southeast Indian Ocean
 Sumatra Trench – Subduction trench in the Sumatra-Andaman subduction zone in the eastern Indian Ocean
 Sunda Trench – An oceanic trench in the Indian Ocean near Sumatra where the Australian-Capricorn plates subduct under a part of the Eurasian Plate.
 Oceanic trenches of the Pacific Ocean
 Aleutian Trench – An oceanic trench along the convergent plate boundary between the southern coastline of Alaska and the Aleutian islands
 Farallon Trench – A subduction related tectonic formation off the coast of western California during the late to mid Cenozoic era
 Galathea Depth – the portion the Philippine Trench exceeding 6,000-metre (20,000 ft) depths in the south-western Pacific Ocean
 Hikurangi Trench – An oceanic trench in the bed of the Pacific off the east coast of the North Island of New Zealand
 Intermontane Trench – An ancient oceanic trench during the Triassic, parallel to the west coast of North America
 Izu–Ogasawara Trench – Aan oceanic trench in the western Pacific, consisting of the Izu Trench and the Bonin Trench
 Japan Trench – An oceanic trench – part of the Pacific Ring of Fire – off northeast Japan
 Kermadec Trench – A linear ocean trench in the south Pacific north west of New Zealand
 Kuril–Kamchatka Trench – An oceanic trench in the northwest Pacific off the southeast coast of Kamchatka and parallels the Kuril Island chain to meet the Japan Trench east of Hokkaido
 Manila Trench – Oceanic trench in the Pacific Ocean, west of Luzon and Mindoro in the Philippines
 Mariana Trench – The deepest part of Earth's oceans, where the Pacific Plate is subducted under the Mariana Plate
 Middle America Trench – A subduction zone in the eastern Pacific off the southwestern coast of Middle America
 Peru–Chile Trench – An oceanic trench in the eastern Pacific Ocean off the coast of South America
 Philippine Trench – A submarine trench to the east of the Philippines in the Pacific Ocean
 Puysegur Trench – A deep cleft in the floor of the south Tasman Sea south of New Zealand's South Island
 Ryukyu Trench – Oceanic trench along the southeastern edge of Japan's Ryukyu Islands in the Pacific Ocean
 Tonga Trench – An oceanic trench in the south-west Pacific Ocean
 Yap Trench – Oceanic trench in the western Pacific Ocean
 Oceanic trenches of the Southern Ocean 
 Tasman Fracture – An ocean trench off the south west coast of Tasmania 
 Oceanic trenches of ancient oceans
 Tethyan Trench – An oceanic trench that existed in the northern part of the Tethys Ocean during the middle Mesozoic to early Cenozoic eras

Plate tectonics 
Plate tectonics – The scientific theory that describes the large-scale motions of Earth's lithosphere
 Asthenosphere – The highly viscous, mechanically weak and ductile region of the Earth's upper mantle
 Convergent boundary – Region of active deformation between colliding lithospheric plates
 Divergent boundary – Linear feature that exists between two tectonic plates that are moving away from each other
 Flux melting – A process by which the melting point is reduced by the admixture of a material known as a flux
 Fracture zone – A junction between oceanic crustal regions of different ages on the same plate left by a transform fault
 Hydrothermal vent – A fissure in a planet's surface from which geothermally heated water issues
 Lithosphere — The rigid, outermost shell of a terrestrial-type planet or natural satellite that is defined by its rigid mechanical properties
 Lithosphere–asthenosphere boundary – A level representing a mechanical difference between layers in Earth's inner structure
 Marine geology – The study of the history and structure of the ocean floor
 Mid-ocean ridge – An underwater mountain system formed by plate tectonic spreading
 Mohorovičić discontinuity – Boundary between the Earth's crust and the mantle
 Oceanic crust – The uppermost layer of the oceanic portion of a tectonic plate
 Outer trench swell – A subtle ridge on the seafloor near an oceanic trench, where a descending plate begins to flex and fault
 Ridge push – A proposed driving force for tectonic plate motion as the result of the lithosphere sliding down the raised asthenosphere below mid-ocean ridges
 Seafloor spreading – A process at mid-ocean ridges, where new oceanic crust is formed through volcanic activity and then gradually moves away from the ridge
 Slab pull – That part of the motion of a tectonic plate that is caused by its subduction
 Slab suction – A plate tectonic driving force of shear tractions between the subducting slab and nearby plates
 Slab window – A gap that forms in a subducted oceanic plate when a mid-ocean ridge meets with a subduction zone and the ridge is subducted
 Subduction – A geological process at convergent tectonic plate boundaries where one plate moves under the other
 Superswell – A large area of anomalously high topography and shallow ocean regions
 African superswell – A region including the Southern and Eastern African plateaus and the Southeastern Atlantic basin where exceptional tectonic uplift has occurred
 Darwin Rise – A broad triangular region in the north central Pacific Ocean where there is a concentration of atolls
 Transform fault – A plate boundary where the motion is predominantly horizontal
 Vine–Matthews–Morley hypothesis – The first key scientific test of the seafloor spreading theory of continental drift and plate tectonics.
 Volcanic arc – A chain of volcanoes formed above a subducting plate

Seamounts 

Seamount – A mountain rising from the ocean seafloor that does not reach to the water's surface
 Asphalt volcano – Ocean floor vents that erupt asphalt instead of lava
 Guyot – An isolated underwater volcanic mountain with a flat top
 List of seamounts by summit depth – 
 Outline of Seamounts/Index of Seamounts?

Seamounts of the Atlantic Ocean 
 American Scout Seamount – A seamount that appeared on charts, but was later not found to exist at the position given
 Anton Dohrn Seamount – A guyot in the Rockall Trough in the northeast Atlantic
 Cadamosto Seamount – A seamount in the North Atlantic Ocean southwest of the island of Brava, Cape Verde
 Caryn Seamount – A seamount in the Atlantic Ocean southwest of the New England Seamounts
 Charles Darwin volcanic field – A volcanic field off Santo Antao
 Condor seamount – A submarine mountain west-southwest of Faial Island in the Azores
 Coral Patch Seamount – A submarine mountain southwest of Portugal
 Corner Rise Seamounts – A chain of extinct submarine volcanoes in the northern Atlantic Ocean
 Bean Seamount – A seamount in the northern Atlantic Ocean in the Corner Rise Seamounts
 Caloosahatchee Seamount – A seamount in the northern Atlantic Ocean in the Corner Rise Seamounts
 Discovery Seamounts – A chain of seamounts in the Southern Atlantic Ocean
 Dom João de Castro Bank – A large submarine volcano in the north Atlantic between São Miguel and Terceira in the Azores
 Echo Bank – A seamount southwest of the Canary Islands
 Fogo Seamounts – A group of seamounts offshore of Newfoundland and southwest of the Grand Banks
 Algerine Seamount – One of the Fogo Seamounts in the North Atlantic
 Birma Seamount – One of the Fogo Seamounts in the North Atlantic
 Carpathia Seamount – One of the Fogo Seamounts in the North Atlantic
 Frankfurt Seamount – One of the Fogo Seamounts in the North Atlantic
 Mackay-Bennett Seamount – One of the Fogo Seamounts in the North Atlantic
 Montmagny Seamount – One of the Fogo Seamounts in the North Atlantic
 Mount Temple Seamount – One of the Fogo Seamounts in the North Atlantic
 George Bligh Bank – A seamount in the Rockall Trough in the northeast Atlantic, west of Scotland
 Gorringe Ridge – A seamount in the Atlantic Ocean on the Azores–Gibraltar fault zone
 Hebrides Terrace Seamount – A seamount west-southwest of the Hebrides
 Henry Seamount – A seamount southeast of El Hierro
 Krylov Seamount – A seamount west of Cape Verde
 Monaco Bank (volcano) – A submarine volcano in the Azores
 Muir Seamount – Underwater volcano on the Bermuda rise in the Atlantic
 New England Seamounts – A chain of more than 20 seamounts in the Atlantic Ocean
 Allegheny Seamount – One of the New England Seamounts in the North Atlantic
 Asterias Seamount – One of the New England Seamounts in the North Atlantic
 Balanus Seamount – One of the New England Seamounts in the North Atlantic
 Bear Seamount – A flat-topped underwater volcano in the Atlantic Ocean. It is the oldest of the New England Seamounts
 Buell Seamount – One of the New England Seamounts in the North Atlantic
 Gerda Seamount – One of the New England Seamounts in the North Atlantic
 Gilliss Seamount – One of the New England Seamounts in the North Atlantic
 Gosnold Seamount – One of the New England Seamounts in the North Atlantic
 Gregg Seamount – One of the New England Seamounts in the North Atlantic
 Hodgson Seamount – One of the New England Seamounts in the North Atlantic
 Kelvin Seamount – A guyot of the New England Seamounts in the North Atlantic
 Kiwi Seamount, Atlantic Ocean – One of the New England Seamounts in the North Atlantic
 Manning Seamount – One of the New England Seamounts in the North Atlantic
 Michael Seamount – One of the New England Seamounts in the North Atlantic
 Mytilus Seamount – One of the New England Seamounts in the North Atlantic
 Nashville Seamount – One of the New England Seamounts in the North Atlantic
 Panulirus Seamount – One of the New England Seamounts in the North Atlantic
 Physalia Seamount – One of the New England Seamounts in the North Atlantic
 Picket Seamount – One of the New England Seamounts in the North Atlantic
 Rehoboth Seamount – One of the New England Seamounts in the North Atlantic
 Retriever Seamount – One of the New England Seamounts in the North Atlantic
 San Pablo Seamount – One of the New England Seamounts in the North Atlantic
 Sheldrake Seamount – One of the New England Seamounts in the North Atlantic
 Vogel Seamount – One of the New England Seamounts in the North Atlantic
 Newfoundland Ridge – An ocean ridge in the northern Atlantic Ocean on the east coast of Canada
 Newfoundland Seamounts – A group of seamounts offshore of Eastern Canada in the northern Atlantic Ocean.
 Princess Alice Bank – A seamount to the southwest of Pico and Faial in the Azores
 Protector Shoal – A submarine volcano NW of Zavodovski Island in the South Sandwich Islands
 Rosemary Bank – A seamount west of Scotland in the Rockall Trough
 Sahara Seamounts – A group of seamounts in the Atlantic Ocean southwest of the Canary Islands
 Sedlo Seamount – An isolated underwater volcano in the Northeast Atlantic, northeast of Graciosa Island
 Seewarte Seamounts – A north-south trending group of extinct submarine volcanoes in the northern Atlantic Ocean
 Great Meteor Seamount – A large guyot in the Southern Azores Seamount Chain
 Spartel – A submerged former island in the Strait of Gibraltar near Cape Spartel and the Spartel Sill
 St. Helena Seamount chain – An underwater chain of seamounts in the southern Atlantic Ocean
 Tropic Seamount – A seamount southwest of the Canary Islands
 Vema Seamount – A seamount in the South Atlantic east of Cape Town
 Walvis Ridge – An aseismic ocean ridge in the southern Atlantic Ocean.
 Ewing Seamount – A seamount in the southern Atlantic in the Walvis Ridge

Seamounts of the Indian Ocean 
 Boomerang Seamount – An active submarine volcano northeast of Amsterdam Island in the Indian Ocean
 Christmas Island Seamount Province – A group of more than 50 submarine volcanos named for Christmas Island
 Muirfield Seamount – A submarine mountain in the Indian Ocean southwest of the Cocos (Keeling) Islands
 Walters Shoals – A group of submerged mountains off the coast of Madagascar

Seamounts of the Mediterranean 
 Empedocles (volcano) – A large underwater volcano off the southern coast of Sicily
 Eratosthenes Seamount – A seamount in the Eastern Mediterranean south of western Cyprus
 Graham Island (Mediterranean Sea) – A submerged volcanic island south of Sicily
 Marsili – A large undersea volcano in the Tyrrhenian Sea south of Naples

Seamounts of the Pacific Ocean 
 2012 Kermadec Islands eruption – A major undersea volcanic eruption in the Kermadec Islands of New Zealand
 Abbott Seamount – A seamount lying within the Hawaiian-Emperor seamount chain in the northern Pacific Ocean
 Adams Seamount – A submarine volcano above the Pitcairn hotspot in the central Pacific Ocean
 Alexa Bank – A seamount in Samoa, northwest of Rotuma
 Allison Guyot – A seamount in the Mid-Pacific Mountains
 Banc Capel – A guyot, or flat-topped underwater volcano, in the Coral Sea
 Bollons Seamount – A continental fragment seamount southeast of New Zealand
 Bounty Seamount – A seamount in the Pacific Ocean near Pitcairn Island
 Browns Mountain – A small submarine mountain in the south-western Pacific Ocean off the coast of New South Wales, Australia, east of Sydney.
 Cape Johnson Guyot – A seamount in the Pacific Ocean
 Capricorn Seamount – A seamount east of Tonga
 Carondelet Reef – A horseshoe-shaped reef of the Phoenix Islands in the Republic of Kiribati
 Chelan Seamount – A submerged volcano in the Pacific Ocean off the coast of Vancouver Island,
 Cobb–Eickelberg Seamount chain – A range of undersea mountains formed by volcanic activity of the Cobb hotspot in the Pacific Ocean
 Axial Seamount – A submarine volcano on the Juan de Fuca Ridge west of Oregon
 Brown Bear Seamount – An underwater volcano west of the coast of Oregon. It is connected to the larger Axial Seamount by a small ridge
 Cobb Seamount – Underwater volcano west of Grays Harbor, Washington, United States
 Patton Seamount – Underwater volcano in the Cobb–Eickelberg Seamount chain in the Gulf of Alaska
 Cordell Bank National Marine Sanctuary – 
 Cortes Bank – A shallow seamount in the North Pacific Ocean southwest of Los Angeles
 Cross Seamount – A seamount far southwest of the Hawaii archipelago
 Crough Seamount – A seamount in the Pacific Ocean, within the exclusive economic zone of Pitcairn
 Daiichi-Kashima Seamount – A guyot in the Western Pacific Ocean off Japan
 Daikakuji Guyot – A seamount in the Hawaiian Emperor chain bend area
 Darwin Guyot – A seamount in the Pacific Ocean
 Davidson Seamount – Underwater volcano off the coast of Central California, southwest of Monterey
 Dellwood Seamounts – A seamount range in the Pacific Ocean northwest of Vancouver Island, Canada
 Detroit Seamount – One of the oldest seamounts of the Hawaiian-Emperor seamount chain
 Eastern Gemini Seamount – A seamount in the southwestern Pacific Ocean, about halfway between Vanuatu's Tanna and Matthew Islands
 Emperor of China (volcano) – A submarine volcano in the western part of the Banda Sea, Indonesia
 Erimo Seamount – A seamount off Japan which is in the process of being subducted
 Explorer Seamount – A seamount on the Explorer Ridge in the Pacific Ocean off the coast of British Columbia, Canada
 Ferrel Seamount – A small underwater volcano west of Baja California
 Filippo Reef – A reef that is asserted to be in the Pacific Ocean east of Starbuck Island in the Line Islands
 Foundation Seamounts – A series of seamounts in the southern Pacific Ocean in a chain which starts at the Pacific–Antarctic Ridge
 Geologists Seamounts – A group of 9 seamounts in the Pacific Ocean south of Honolulu, Hawaii
 Graham Seamount – Underwater volcano in the Pacific Ocean off the coast of the Queen Charlotte Islands, British Columbia, Canada
 Graveyard Seamounts – A series of 28 small underwater volcanoes on the Chatham Rise, east of New Zealand
 Green Seamount – An underwater volcano off the western coast of Mexico
 Guide Seamount – An underwater volcano in the eastern Pacific Ocean near the Davidson, Pioneer, Rodriguez, and Gumdrop seamounts
 Gumdrop Seamount – A small underwater volcano on the flank of Pioneer Seamount, off the coast of Central California
 Hawaiian–Emperor seamount chain – A mostly undersea mountain range in the Pacific Ocean that reaches above sea level in Hawaii.
List of volcanoes in the Hawaiian–Emperor seamount chain 
 Abbott Seamount – A seamount lying within the Hawaiian-Emperor seamount chain in the northern Pacific Ocean
 Colahan Seamount – A seamount in the Hawaiian-Emperor seamount chain in the northern Pacific
 Daikakuji Guyot – A seamount in the Hawaiian Emperor chain bend area
 Detroit Seamount – One of the oldest seamounts of the Hawaiian-Emperor seamount chain
 East Molokai Volcano – An extinct shield volcano comprising the eastern two-thirds of the island of Molokaʻi in the U.S. state of Hawaii.
 Evolution of Hawaiian volcanoes – Processes of growth and erosion of the volcanoes of the Hawaiian islands
 French Frigate Shoals – The largest atoll in the Northwestern Hawaiian Islands
 Gardner Pinnacles – Two barren rock outcrops surrounded by a reef in the Northwestern Hawaiian Islands
 Hancock Seamount – A seamount of the Hawaiian-Emperor seamount chain in the Pacific Ocean.
 Hawaii hotspot – A volcanic hotspot located near the Hawaiian Islands, in the northern Pacific Ocean
 Jingū Seamount – A guyot of the Hawaiian-Emperor seamount chain in the Pacific Ocean
 Kaena Ridge – A submerged remnant of an ancient shield volcano to the north of the Hawaiian Island of Oʻahu
 Kamaʻehuakanaloa Seamount (formerly Lōʻihi) – An active submarine volcano off the southeast coast of the island of Hawaii
 Kammu Seamount – A seamount in the Hawaiian-Emperor seamount chain in the Pacific Ocean
 Kaʻula – A small, crescent-shaped offshore islet in the Hawaiian Islands
 Kimmei Seamount – A seamount of the Hawaiian-Emperor seamount chain in the northern Pacific Ocean.
 Koko Guyot – A guyot near the southern end of the Emperor seamounts north of the bend in the Hawaiian-Emperor seamount chain.
 Kure Atoll – An atoll in the Pacific Ocean in the Northwestern Hawaiian Islands
 Lanai – The sixth-largest of the Hawaiian Islands
 Laysan – One of the Northwestern Hawaiian Islands
 Lisianski Island – One of the Northwestern Hawaiian Islands
 Māhukona – A submerged shield volcano on the northwestern flank of the Island of Hawaiʻi
 Maro Reef – A largely submerged coral atoll in the Northwestern Hawaiian Islands
 Meiji Seamount – The oldest seamount in the Hawaiian-Emperor seamount chain
 Midway Atoll – One of the United States Minor Outlying Islands in the Hawaiian archipelago
 Necker Island (Hawaii) – A small island in the Northwestern Hawaiian Islands
 Nihoa – The tallest of ten islands and atolls in the uninhabited Northwestern Hawaiian Islands
 Niihau – The westernmost and seventh largest inhabited island in Hawaiʻi
 Nintoku Seamount – A flat topped seamount in the Hawaiian-Emperor seamount chain
 Ojin Seamount – A guyot of the Hawaiian-Emperor seamount chain in the Pacific Ocean
 Pearl and Hermes Atoll – Part of the Northwestern Hawaiian Islands
 Penguin Bank – A now-submerged shield volcano of the Hawaiian Islands
 Suiko Seamount – A guyot of the Hawaiian-Emperor seamount chain in the Pacific Ocean.
 Waiʻanae Range – The eroded remains of an ancient shield volcano that comprises the western half of the Hawaiian Island of Oʻahu
 West Maui Mountains – A much eroded shield volcano that constitutes the western one-quarter of the Hawaiian Island of Maui
 Yomei Seamount – A seamount of the Hawaiian-Emperor seamount chain in the northern Pacific Ocean
 Yuryaku Seamount – A flat topped seamount of the Hawaiian-Emperor seamount chain in the northern Pacific Ocean
 Heck Seamount – An underwater volcano in the Pacific Ocean off the coast of central Vancouver Island, British Columbia
 Hollister Ridge – A group of seamounts in the Pacific Ocean west of the Pacific–Antarctic Ridge
 Horizon Guyot – A guyot in the Mid-Pacific Mountains
 Ioah Guyot – A guyot in the Western Pacific Ocean
 Ita Mai Tai – A guyot in the Western Pacific Ocean
 Jasper Seamount – Underwater volcano in the Fieberling-Guadalupe seamount track, west of Baja California, Mexico
 Kavachi – An active submarine volcano in the south-west Pacific Ocean south of Vangunu Island in the Solomon Islands
 Kodiak–Bowie Seamount chain – A seamount chain in southeastern Gulf of Alaska stretching from the Aleutian Trench in the north to Bowie Seamount
 Bowie Seamount – Submarine volcano in the northeastern Pacific Ocean 
 Denson Seamount – A submarine volcano in the Kodiak-Bowie Seamount chain at the end of the chain near the Canada–United States border
 Hodgkins Seamount – A seamount in the Kodiak-Bowie Seamount chain in the north Pacific
 Kodiak Seamount – The oldest seamount in the Kodiak-Bowie Seamount chain
 Peirce Seamount – A member of the Kodiak-Bowie Seamount chain in the north Pacific
 Tuzo Wilson Seamounts – Two active submarine volcanoes off the coast of British Columbia, Canada
 Koko Guyot – A guyot near the southern end of the Emperor seamounts north of the bend in the Hawaiian-Emperor seamount chain.
 Lamont seamount chain – A chain of seamounts in the Pacific Ocean
 Lemkein – A seamount in the Marshall Islands
 Limalok – A Cretaceous-Paleocene guyot in the Marshall Islands
 List of seamounts in the Marshall Islands – 
 Lo-En – An Albian-Campanian guyot in the Marshall Islands in the Pacific Ocean
 Lōʻihi Seamount – An active submarine volcano off the southeast coast of the island of Hawaii
 Lomilik – A seamount in the Marshall Islands
 Lord Howe Seamount Chain – The seamount chain east of Australia that includes Lord Howe Island
 Louisville Ridge – A chain of over 70 seamounts in the Southwest Pacific Ocean
 Osbourn Seamount – The westernmost and oldest non-subducted seamount of the Louisville Ridge
 Louisville hotspot – A volcanic hotspot that formed the Louisville Ridge in the southern Pacific Ocean
 Macdonald seamount – A seamount in Polynesia, southeast of the Austral Islands
 Malulu – A submarine volcano south of American Samoa
 Marisla Seamount – Undersea mountain north-northeast of La Paz, Mexico
 Marpi Reef – A narrow seamount north of Saipan in the Northern Marianas
 MIT Guyot – A guyot in the Western Pacific northwest of Marcus Island and about halfway between Japan and the Marshall Islands
 Moai (seamount) – The second most westerly submarine volcano in the Easter Seamount Chain
 Monowai Seamount – A volcanic seamount to the north of New Zealand in the Kermadec arc
 Musicians Seamounts – A chain of seamounts in the Pacific Ocean, north of the Hawaiian Ridge
 Myōjin-shō – A submarine volcano south of Tokyo on the Izu–Ogasawara Ridge
 Nieuwerkerk (volcano) – A submarine volcano in the Banda Sea, Indonesia
 Oshawa Seamount – A submarine volcano in the Pacific off the coast of the Queen Charlotte Islands, British Columbia
 Osprey Reef – A submerged atoll in the Coral Sea, northeast of Queensland, Australia. It is part of the Northwestern Group of the Coral Sea Islands
 Pactolus Bank – Unconfirmed undersea bank in the southern Pacific Ocean.
 Panov Seamount – Minor seamount in the southeast Pacific near the western part of the Valdivia Fracture Zone
 Pasco banks – A long ridge-like seamount in the south Pacific
 Pioneer Seamount – An undersea mountain in the Pacific Ocean off the coast of central California
 Pito Seamount – A seamount in the Pacific Ocean north-northwest of Easter Island
 President Jackson Seamounts – A series of seamounts on the Pacific Plate off California
 President Thiers Bank – A broad guyot, northwest of Rapa, southeast of Raivavae, in the Austral Islands
 Pukao (seamount) – A submarine volcano, the most westerly in the Easter Seamount Chain
 Rano Rahi seamounts – A field of seamounts in the Pacific Ocean, part of a series of ridges on the Pacific Plate
 Resolution Guyot – A submerged island in the Mid-Pacific Mountains
 Rivadeneyra Shoal – A shoal or seamount reported from the Eastern Pacific Ocean between Malpelo Island and Cocos Island
 Rodriguez Seamount – A flat topped seamount off the coast of Central California
 Rosa Seamount – An uplifted piece of the sea floor west of the Baja California
 Ruwitūn̄tūn̄ – A guyot in the Marshall Islands in the Pacific Ocean
 Schmieder Bank – A rocky bank west of Point Sur, California, south of Monterey
 Seminole Seamount – A seamount in the Pacific Ocean off the coast of northern Vancouver Island, British Columbia
 Siletz River Volcanics – A sequence of basaltic pillow lavas that make up part of Siletzia
 South Chamorro Seamount – A large serpentinite mud volcano and seamount in the Izu–Bonin–Mariana Arc
 Stirni Seamount – A seamount in the Pacific Ocean off the coast of northern Vancouver Island, British Columbia
 Submarine 1922 – A submarine volcano found in the Sangihe Islands of Indonesia in 1922
 Suiyo Seamount – A submarine volcano off the eastern coast of Japan, at the southern tip of the Izu Islands.
 Supply Reef – A submerged circular reef of volcanic origin in the Northern Mariana Islands
 Takuyo-Daini – A guyot in the Western Pacific Ocean off Japan
 Takuyo-Daisan – A guyot in the Western Pacific Ocean off Japan
 Tamu Massif – An extinct submarine shield volcano located in the northwestern Pacific Ocean
 Taney Seamounts – Five extinct underwater volcanoes west of San Francisco on the Pacific Plate
 Tasmanian Seamounts – A group of underwater volcanoes off the southern tip of Tasmania
 Tasmantid Seamount Chain – A long chain of seamounts in the South Pacific Ocean
 Taukina seamounts – A series of seamounts on the Pacific Plate near the Macdonald hotspot and the Ngatemato seamounts
 Teahitia – A submarine volcano northeast of the southeast tip of Tahiti in the Society Islands
 Three Wise Men (volcanoes) – A row of three underwater volcanoes on the East Pacific Rise
 Tucker Seamount – A seamount in the Pacific Ocean off the coast of northern Vancouver Island, British Columbia
 Union Seamount – A seamount in the Pacific Ocean off the coast of northern Vancouver Island, British Columbia
 Vailulu'u – A volcanic seamount in the Samoa Islands
 Vance Seamounts – A group of seven submarine volcanoes located west of the Juan de Fuca Ridge
 Vlinder Guyot – A guyot in the Western Pacific Ocean
 Winslow Reef, Phoenix Islands – an underwater feature of the Phoenix Islands, Republic of Kiribati
 Wōdejebato – A guyot in the Marshall Islands northwest of the smaller Pikinni Atoll
 Yersey – A submarine volcano in Indonesia

Seamounts of the Southern Ocean – 
 List of seamounts in the Southern Ocean – 
 Adare Seamounts – The seamounts in Balleny Basin
 Balleny Seamounts – Seamounts named in association with the Balleny Islands
 Barsukov Seamount – A seamount named in honor of the Russian scientist, Valeri Barsukov
 Belgica Guyot – An undersea tablemount named for the Belgian research ship Belgica
 Dallmann Seamount – A seamount named for polar explorer Eduard Dallmann
 De Gerlache Seamounts – Seamounts in Antarctica, named for Lieutenant Adrien Victor Joseph de Gerlache
 Hakurei Seamount – A seamount off Adélie Land, Antarctica
 Iselin Seamount – A seamount in the Southern Ocean off Antarctica
 Kemp Caldera – A seamount-caldera pair south of the South Sandwich Islands
 Lecointe Guyot – An undersea tablemount named for Georges Lecointe, navigator/astronomer aboard the Belgica
 Lichtner Seamount – A seamount in the Southern Ocean
 Maud Seamount – A seamount in the Southern Ocean
 Orca Seamount – Underwater volcano near King George Island in Antarctica, in the Bransfield Strait.
 Rosenthal Seamount – A seamount in the Weddell Sea named for Alfred Rosenthal
 Wordie Seamount – A seamount in Bransfield Strait, Antarctica

Subduction zones 
Subduction zones – A geological process at convergent tectonic plate boundaries where one plate moves under the other
 Aleutian subduction zone – Convergence boundary between the North American Plate and the Pacific Plate, that extends from the Alaska Range to the Kamchatka Peninsula.
 Aleutian Trench – An oceanic trench along the convergent plate boundary between the southern coastline of Alaska and the Aleutian islands
 Cascadia subduction zone – Convergent plate boundary that stretches from northern Vancouver Island to Northern California
 Farallon Trench – A subduction related tectonic formation off the coast of western California during the late to mid Cenozoic era
 Galathea Depth – The portion the Philippine Trench exceeding 6,000-metre (20,000 ft) depths in the south-western Pacific Ocean
 Hikurangi Margin – Subduction zone off the east coast of New Zealand's North Island
 Hikurangi Trench – An oceanic trench in the bed of the Pacific off the east coast of the North Island of New Zealand
 Intermontane Trench – An ancient oceanic trench during the Triassic, parallel to the west coast of North America
 Izu–Ogasawara Trench – Aan oceanic trench in the western Pacific, consisting of the Izu Trench and the Bonin Trench
 Japan Trench – An oceanic trench – part of the Pacific Ring of Fire – off northeast Japan
 Kermadec Trench – A linear ocean trench in the south Pacific north west of New Zealand
 Kermadec-Tonga subduction zone – A convergent plate boundary that stretches from the North Island of New Zealand northward
 Kuril–Kamchatka Trench – An oceanic trench in the northwest Pacific off the southeast coast of Kamchatka and parallels the Kuril Island chain to meet the Japan Trench east of Hokkaido
 Lesser Antilles subduction zone – A convergent plate boundary along the eastern margin of the Lesser Antilles island arc
 Makran Trench – A subduction zone along the northeastern margin of the Gulf of Oman adjacent to the southwestern coast of Balochistan of Pakistan and the southeastern coast of Iran
 Manila Trench – Oceanic trench in the Pacific Ocean, west of Luzon and Mindoro in the Philippines
 Mariana Trench – The deepest part of Earth's oceans, where the Pacific Plate is subducted under the Mariana Plate
 Middle America Trench – A subduction zone in the eastern Pacific off the southwestern coast of Middle America
 Peru–Chile Trench – An oceanic trench in the eastern Pacific Ocean off the coast of South America
 Philippine Trench – A submarine trench to the east of the Philippines in the Pacific Ocean
 Puerto Rico Trench – An oceanic trench on a transform boundary between the Caribbean and North American Plates
 Puysegur Trench – A deep cleft in the floor of the south Tasman Sea south of New Zealand's South Island
 Ryukyu Trench – Oceanic trench along the southeastern edge of Japan's Ryukyu Islands in the Pacific Ocean
 South Sandwich Trench – A deep arcuate trench in the South Atlantic Ocean east of the South Sandwich Islands
 Sumatra Trench – Subduction trench in the Sumatra-Andaman subduction zone in the eastern Indian Ocean
 Sunda Trench – An oceanic trench in the Indian Ocean near Sumatra where the Australian-Capricorn plates subduct under a part of the Eurasian Plate.
 Tonga Trench – An oceanic trench in the south-west Pacific Ocean
 Tonga-Kermadec Ridge – An oceanic ridge in the south-west Pacific Ocean underlying the Tonga-Kermadec island arc
 Yap Trench – Oceanic trench in the western Pacific Ocean
 Zagros fold and thrust belt – zone of deformed crustal rocks, formed in the foreland of the collision between the Arabian Plate and the Eurasian Plate

Submarine calderas 
Submarine calderas – Volcanic calderas that are partially or fully submerged under the water of a larger ocean or lake, sometimes forming a reef, bay or harbor. 
 Aden – Port city and temporary capital of Yemen
 Aira Caldera – A large flooded coastal volcanic caldera in the south of the island of Kyūshū, Japan
 Auckland Islands – A volcanic archipelago of New Zealand's subantarctic islands
 Avacha Bay – A Pacific Ocean bay on the southeastern coast of the Kamchatka Peninsula
 Deception Island – An island in the South Shetland Islands archipelago, with one of the safest harbours in Antarctica
 Iwo Jima – Island of the Japanese Volcano Islands chain south of the Ogasawara Islands
 Kāneʻohe Bay – Large bay of volcanic origin in the Hawaiian island O'ahu
 Kikai Caldera – A mostly submerged caldera in the Ōsumi Islands of Kagoshima Prefecture, Japan.
 Kolumbo – Active submarine volcano in the Agean Sea near Santorini
 Krakatoa – A volcanic island in the Sunda Strait between Java and Sumatra in Indonesia
 Kuwae – A submarine caldera between the Epi and Tongoa islands in Vanuatu
 Lvinaya Past – A volcano in the southern part of Iturup in the Kuril Islands, claimed by Japan and administered by Russia
 Lyttelton Harbour – Inlet in the Banks Peninsula, on the coast of Canterbury, New Zealand
 Macauley Island – A volcanic island in New Zealand's Kermadec Islands
 Milos – A volcanic Greek island in the Aegean Sea, just north of the Sea of Crete
 Otago Harbour – The natural harbour of Dunedin, New Zealand
 Phlegraean Fields – A large volcanic area west of Naples, Italy
 Rabaul caldera – A large volcano on the tip of the Gazelle Peninsula in East New Britain, Papua New Guinea
 Raoul Island – A volcano in the Kermadec Islands, New Zealand
 Santorini – A volcanic island in the southern Aegean Sea

Paleoceanography 
Paleoceanography – The study of the history of the oceans in the geologic past
 Anoxic event – Intervals in the Earth's past where parts of oceans were depleted of oxygen at depth over a large geographic area 
 Geologic temperature record – Changes in Earth's environment as determined from geologic evidence on multi-million to billion year time scales
 Gulf Trough – An ancient geologic feature of Florida present during the Paleogene period
 List of ancient oceans – A list of former oceans that disappeared due to tectonic movements and other geographical and climatic changes 
 Marine isotope stage – Alternating warm and cool periods in the Earth's paleoclimate, deduced from oxygen isotope data
 Marine Isotope Stage 5 – A stage in the geologic temperature record, between 130,000 and 80,000 years ago
 Marine Isotope Stage 11 – A stage in the geologic temperature record, covering the interglacial period between 424,000 and 374,000 years ago
 Marine Isotope Stage 13 – A stage in the geologic temperature record, covering the interglacial period between ~524,000 and 474,000 years ago
 Maui Nui – Name given to a prehistoric Hawaiian Island built from seven shield volcanoes (paleo?)
 Proxy (climate) – reserved physical characteristics allowing reconstruction of past climatic conditions
 Quaternary – Third and current period of the Cenozoic geological era
 Termination (geomorphology) – The period of time during a glacial cycle when there is a relatively rapid transition from full glacial climates to full interglacial climates

Physical Oceanography 
(Outline of physical oceanography – Hierarchical outline list of articles on physical oceanography) 

Physical oceanography – The study of physical conditions and physical processes within the ocean

Acoustics 
Acoustical oceanography – The use of underwater sound to study the sea, its boundaries and its contents
 Deep scattering layer – A layer in the ocean consisting of a variety of marine animals that migrate vertically every day
 Hydroacoustics – The study and technological application of sound in water
 Ocean acoustic tomography – A technique used to measure temperatures and currents over large regions of the ocean
 SOFAR channel – A horizontal layer of water in the ocean at which depth the speed of sound is at its minimum
 Underwater acoustics – The study of the propagation of sound in water and the interaction of sound waves with the water and its boundaries

Circulation 
Circulation terminology and concepts: 
 Atmospheric circulation – The large-scale movement of air, a process which distributes thermal energy about the Earth's surface
 Baroclinity – A measure of misalignment between the gradient of pressure and the gradient of density in a fluid
 Boundary current – Ocean current with dynamics determined by the presence of a coastline
 Coriolis force – Inertial force that acts on objects in motion relative to a rotating reference frame
 Coriolis–Stokes force – A forcing of the mean flow in a rotating fluid due to interaction of the Coriolis effect and wave-induced Stokes drift
 Craik–Leibovich vortex force – A forcing of the mean flow through wave–current interaction
 Downwelling – The process of accumulation and sinking of higher density material beneath lower density material
 Drift seed – Seeds and fruits adapted for long-distance dispersal by water
 Eddy – The swirling of a fluid and the reverse current created when the fluid is in a turbulent flow regime
 Ekman layer – The layer in a fluid where there is a force balance between pressure gradient force, Coriolis force and turbulent drag
 Ekman spiral – A structure of currents or winds near a horizontal boundary in which the flow direction rotates as one moves away from the boundary
 Ekman transport – Net transport of surface water perpendicular to wind direction 
 Front (oceanography) – A boundary between two distinct water masses
 Geostrophic current – An oceanic flow in which the pressure gradient force is balanced by the Coriolis effect
 Halothermal circulation – The part of the large-scale ocean circulation that is driven by global density gradients created by surface heat and evaporation
 Hydrothermal circulation – Circulation of water driven by heat exchange
 Langmuir circulation – A series of shallow, slow, counter-rotating vortices at the ocean's surface aligned with the wind
 Longshore drift – Sediment moved by the longshore current
 Retroflect – The movement of an ocean current that doubles back on itself
 Rip current –  Narrow current of water which moves directly away from the shore, cutting through the lines of breaking waves 
 Rogue wave – Relatively large and spontaneous ocean surface waves that occur at sea
 Shutdown of thermohaline circulation – An effect of global warming on a major ocean circulation.
 Subsurface currents – Oceanic currents that flow beneath surface currents
 Sverdrup – Unit of measurement of the volumetric rate of transport of ocean currents
 Sverdrup balance – A theoretical relationship between the wind stress exerted on the surface of the open ocean and the vertically integrated meridional (north-south) transport of ocean water.
 Thermohaline circulation – A part of the large-scale ocean circulation that is driven by global density gradients created by surface heat and freshwater fluxes
 Turbidity current – An underwater current of usually rapidly moving, sediment-laden water moving down a slope
 Upwelling – The replacement by deep water moving upwards of surface water driven offshore by wind 
 Warm core ring – A type of mesoscale eddy which breaks off from a warm ocean current. The ring is an independent circulatory system of warm water which can persist for several months
 Whirlpool – Body of rotating water produced by the meeting of opposing currents

Circulation phenomena 
 Antarctic Circumpolar Wave – A coupled ocean/atmosphere wave that circles the Southern Ocean eastward in approximately eight years
 Barents Sea Opening – The sea between Bear Island in the south of Svalbard and the north of Norway through which water flows from the Atlantic into the Arctic Ocean
 Black Sea undersea river – A current of particularly saline water flowing through the Bosphorus Strait and along the seabed of the Black Sea
 Coastal upwelling of the South Eastern Arabian Sea – A typical eastern boundary upwelling system
 El Niño – Warm phase of a cyclic climatic phenomenon in the Pacific Ocean
 El Niño–Southern Oscillation – Irregularly periodic variation in winds and sea surface temperatures over the tropical eastern Pacific Ocean
 Great South Australian Coastal Upwelling System – A seasonal upwelling system in the eastern Great Australian Bight
 Interdecadal Pacific oscillation – An oceanographic/meteorological phenomenon similar to the Pacific decadal oscillation (PDO), but occurring in a wider area of the Pacific
 La Niña – A coupled ocean-atmosphere phenomenon that is the counterpart of El Niño
 North Atlantic oscillation – A weather phenomenon in the North Atlantic Ocean of fluctuations in the difference of atmospheric pressure at sea level between the Icelandic low and the Azores high
 Ocean current – Directional mass flow of oceanic water generated by external or internal forces 
 Ocean gyre – Any large system of recirculating ocean currents
 Pacific decadal oscillation – A robust, recurring pattern of ocean-atmosphere climate variability centered over the mid-latitude Pacific basin
 Pacific–North American teleconnection pattern – A large-scale weather pattern with two modes which relates the atmospheric circulation pattern over the North Pacific Ocean with the one over the North American continent
 South Pacific convergence zone – A band of low-level convergence, cloudiness and precipitation extending from the Western Pacific Warm Pool at the maritime continent south-eastwards towards French Polynesia and as far as the Cook Islands
 Tropical Atlantic SST Dipole – A cross-equatorial sea surface temperature pattern that appears dominant on decadal timescales

To be sorted:
 Fram Strait – The passage between Greenland and Svalbard
 Moby-Duck – Book by Donovan Hohn on the Friendly Floatees
 Subtropical front – (unclear, but generic)
 The Blob (Pacific Ocean) – A large mass of relatively warm water in the Pacific Ocean off the coast of North America (circulation)
 Great Salinity Anomaly – A significant disturbance caused by a major pulse of freshwater input to the Nordic Seas
 Labrador Sea Water – A water mass formed by convective processes in the Labrador Sea
 Subtropical Indian Ocean Dipole – The oscillation of sea surface temperatures in which the Indian Ocean southeast of Madagascar is warmer and then colder than the eastern part off Australia
 Tropical instability waves – A phenomenon in which the interface between areas of warm and cold sea surface temperatures near the equator form a regular pattern of westward-propagating waves

Currents of the Arctic Ocean 
 Baffin Island Current – An ocean current running south down the western side of Baffin Bay in the Arctic Ocean, along Baffin Island
 Beaufort Gyre – A wind-driven ocean current in the Arctic Ocean polar region
 East Greenland Current – A cold, low salinity current that extends from Fram Strait to Cape Farewell off the eastern coat of Greenland
 East Iceland Current – A cold water ocean current that forms as a branch of the East Greenland Current
 Labrador Current – A cold current in the Atlantic Ocean along the coasts of Labrador, Newfoundland and Nova Scotia
 Lomonosov Current – A deep current in the Atlantic Ocean. from the coast of Brazil to the Gulf of Guinea
 North Icelandic Jet – A deep-reaching current that flows along the continental slope of Iceland
 Norwegian Current – A current that flows northeasterly along the Atlantic coast of Norway into the Barents Sea
 Transpolar Drift Stream – An ocean current of the Arctic Ocean
 West Greenland Current – A weak cold water current that flows to the north along the west coast of Greenland.
 West Spitsbergen Current – A warm, salty current that runs poleward just west of Spitsbergen

Currents of the Atlantic Ocean 
 Angola Current – A temporary ocean surface current. It is an extension of the Guinea Current, flowing near western Africa's coast
 Antilles Current – A highly variable surface ocean current of warm water that flows northeasterly past the island chain that separates the Caribbean Sea and the Atlantic Ocean
 Atlantic meridional overturning circulation – A system of currents in the Atlantic Ocean, having a northward flow of warm, salty water in the upper layers and a southward flow of colder, deep waters that are part of the thermohaline circulation
 Azores Current – A generally eastward to southeastward-flowing current in the North Atlantic, originating near the Grand Banks of Newfoundland where it splits from the Gulf Stream
 Baffin Island Current – An ocean current running south down the western side of Baffin Bay in the Arctic Ocean, along Baffin Island
 Benguela Current – The broad, northward flowing ocean current that forms the eastern portion of the South Atlantic Ocean gyre
 Black Sea undersea river – A current of particularly saline water flowing through the Bosphorus Strait and along the seabed of the Black Sea 
 Brazil Current – A warm current that flows south along the Brazilian south coast to the mouth of the Río de la Plata
 Canary Current – A wind-driven surface current that is part of the North Atlantic Gyre
 Cape Horn Current – A cold water current that flows west-to-east around Cape Horn
 Caribbean Current – A warm ocean current that flows northwestward through the Caribbean from the east along the coast of South America into the Gulf of Mexico
 East Greenland Current – A cold, low salinity current that extends from Fram Strait to Cape Farewell off the eastern coat of Greenland
 East Iceland Current – A cold water ocean current that forms as a branch of the East Greenland Current
 Falkland Current – A cold water current that flows northward along the Atlantic coast of Patagonia as far north as the mouth of the Río de la Plata
 Florida Current – A thermal ocean current that flows from the Straits of Florida around the Florida Peninsula and along the southeastern coast of the United States before joining the Gulf Stream near Cape Hatteras
 Good Hope Jet – The northward-running shelf edge frontal jet of the Southern Benguela Current off the Cape Peninsula of South Africa's west coast
 Guinea Current – A slow warm water current that flows to the east along the Guinea coast of West Africa
 Gulf Stream – A warm, swift Atlantic current that originates in the Gulf of Mexico flows round the tip of Florida, along the east coast of the United States before crossing the Atlantic Ocean
 Irminger Current – A north Atlantic current setting westward off the southwest coast of Iceland
 Labrador Current – A cold current in the Atlantic Ocean along the coasts of Labrador, Newfoundland and Nova Scotia
 Lomonosov Current – A deep current in the Atlantic Ocean. from the coast of Brazil to the Gulf of Guinea
 Loop Current – A warm ocean current that flows northward between Cuba and the Yucatán Peninsula into the Gulf of Mexico, loops east and south and exits to the east through the Florida Straits to join the Gulf Stream
 Mann Eddy – A persistent clockwise circulation in the middle of the North Atlantic Ocean
 North Atlantic Current – A powerful warm western boundary current in the north Atlantic Ocean that extends the Gulf Stream northeastward
 North Atlantic Gyre – A major circular system of ocean currents
 North Brazil Current – A warm current that is part of the southwestern North Atlantic Gyre which begins by splitting from the Atlantic South Equatorial Current and flows aling the northwest coast of Brazil until it becomes the Guiana Current
 North Equatorial Current – (dubious – unsourced)
 Norwegian Current – A current that flows northeasterly along the Atlantic coast of Norway into the Barents Sea
 Portugal Current – A weak warm water current that flows south-easterly towards the coast of Portugal
 Rossby whistle – The oscillation of sea-level and bottom pressure in the Caribbean Sea influenced by an oceanic Rossby wave.
 South Atlantic Current – An eastward ocean current, fed by the Brazil Current
 South Equatorial Current – (dubious – unsourced) 
 West Greenland Current – A weak cold water current that flows to the north along the west coast of Greenland.
 West Spitsbergen Current – A warm, salty current that runs poleward just west of Spitsbergen

Currents of the Indian Ocean 
 Agulhas Current – The western boundary current of the southwest Indian Ocean that flows down the east coast of Africa
 Agulhas Return Current – An ocean current in the South Indian Ocean flowing from the Agulhas retroflection along the subtropical front
 East Madagascar Current – Current that flows southward on the east side of Madagascar and subsequently feeds the Agulhas Current
 Equatorial Counter Current – An eastward moving, wind-driven current flowing 10-15m deep found in the Atlantic, Indian, and Pacific Oceans
 Indian Monsoon Current – The seasonally varying ocean current regime found in the tropical regions of the northern Indian Ocean
 Indonesian Throughflow – Ocean current that provides a low-latitude pathway for warm, relatively fresh water to move from the Pacific to the Indian Ocean
 Leeuwin Current – A warm ocean current which flows southwards near the western coast of Australia. It rounds Cape Leeuwin to enter the waters south of Australia where its influence extends as far as Tasmania
 Madagascar Current – The Madagascar current is split into two currents, the North Madagascar Current and the East Madagascar Current
 Mozambique Current – A warm ocean current in the Indian Ocean flowing south along the African east coast in the Mozambique Channel
 North Madagascar Current – an ocean current near Madagascar that flows into the South Equatorial Current just north of Madagascar and is directed into the Mozambique Channel
 Somali Current – An ocean boundary current that flows along the coast of Somalia and Oman in the Western Indian Ocean
 South Australian – 
 South Equatorial Current – Ocean current in the Pacific, Atlantic, and Indian Ocean that flows east-to-west between the equator and about 20 degrees south
 South-West Madagascar Coastal Current – A warm poleward ocean current flowing in the south-west of Madagascar
 West Australian Current – A cool surface current that starts as the Southern Indian Ocean Current and turns north when it approaches Western Australia

Currents of the Pacific Ocean 
 Alaska Current – A warm-water current flowing northwards along the coast of British Columbia and the Alaska Panhandle
 Aleutian Current – An eastward flowing ocean current which lies north of the North Pacific Current;
 California Current – A Pacific Ocean current that flows southward along the western coast of North America from southern British Columbia to the southern Baja California Peninsula
 Cromwell Current – An eastward-flowing subsurface current that extends along the equator in the Pacific Ocean
 Davidson Current – A coastal countercurrent of the Pacific Ocean flowing north along the western coast of the United States from Baja California, Mexico to northern Oregon
 East Australian Current – The southward flowing western boundary current that is formed from the South Equatorial Current reaching the eastern coast of Australia
 East Korea Warm Current – An ocean current in the Sea of Japan which branches off from the Tsushima Current at the eastern end of the Korea Strait, and flows north along the southeastern coast of the Korean peninsula
 Equatorial Counter Current – An eastward moving, wind-driven current flowing 10-15m deep found in the Atlantic, Indian, and Pacific Oceans
 Humboldt Current – A cold, low-salinity eastern boundary current that flows north along the western coast of South America from southern Chile to northern Peru
 Indonesian Throughflow – Ocean current that provides a low-latitude pathway for warm, relatively fresh water to move from the Pacific to the Indian Ocean
 Kamchatka Current – A cold-water current flowing south-westward from the Bering Strait, along the Siberian Pacific coast and the Kamchatka Peninsula
 Kuroshio Current – North flowing ocean current on the west side of the North Pacific Ocean
 Mindanao Current – A narrow, southward flowing ocean current along the eastward side of the southern Philippines
 Mindanao Eddy – A semi-permanent cold-ring eddy formed in the retroflection area of the Mindanao Current.
 North Equatorial Current – A Pacific and Atlantic Ocean current that flows east-to-west between about 10° north and 20° north on the southern side of a clockwise subtropical gyre
 North Korea Cold Current – A cold water current in the Sea of Japan that flows southward from near Vladivostok along the coast of the Korean Peninsula
 North Pacific Current – A slow warm water current that flows west-to-east between 30 and 50 degrees north in the Pacific Ocean
 Oyashio Current – A cold subarctic ocean current that flows south and circulates counterclockwise in the western North Pacific Ocean
 South Equatorial Current – Ocean current in the Pacific, Atlantic, and Indian Ocean that flows east-to-west between the equator and about 20 degrees south
 Subtropical Countercurrent – A narrow eastward ocean current in the central North Pacific Ocean
 Tasman Front – A relatively warm water east-flowing surface current and thermal boundary that separates the Coral Sea to the north and the Tasman Sea to the south
 Tasman Outflow – A deepwater current that flows from the Pacific Ocean past Tasmania into the Southern Ocean that encircles Antarctica

Currents of the Southern Ocean 
 Antarctic Circumpolar Current – Ocean current that flows clockwise from west to east around Antarctica
 Tasman Outflow – A deepwater current that flows from the Pacific Ocean past Tasmania into the Southern Ocean that encircles Antarctica

Ocean gyres 
Ocean gyre – Any large system of recirculating ocean currents
 Beaufort Gyre – A wind-driven ocean current in the Arctic Ocean polar region
 Indian Ocean Gyre – A large systems of rotating ocean currents. The Indian Ocean gyre is composed of two major currents: the South Equatorial Current, and the West Australian Current
 North Atlantic Gyre – A major circulating system of ocean currents
 North Pacific Gyre – A major circulating system of ocean currents
 North Pacific Subtropical Gyre represented by Ecosystem of the North Pacific Subtropical Gyre –The largest contiguous ecosystem on earth and a major circulating system of ocean currents
 Ross Gyre – A circulating system of ocean currents in the Ross Sea
 South Atlantic Gyre – The subtropical gyre in the south Atlantic Ocean
 South Pacific Gyre – A major circulating system of ocean currents
 Weddell Gyre – One of the two gyres that exist within the Southern Ocean

Coastal and oceanic landforms 
Landforms – Natural features of the solid surface of the Earth or other planetary body
 Bathymetric chart – Map visually representing the submerged terrain
 Hydrography – Applied science of measurement and description of physical features of bodies of water
 Superswell – A large area of anomalously high topography and shallow ocean regions
 Volcanic arc – A chain of volcanoes formed above a subducting plate
 Wave-cut platform – The narrow flat area often found at the base of a sea cliff or along the shoreline of a lake, bay, or sea that was created by erosion
 Windwatt – A type of mudflat exposed as a result of wind action on water

Coastal landforms 

 Anchialine pool – A landlocked body of water with a subterranean connection to the ocean.
 Archipelago – A group of islands
 List of archipelagos – A list of archipelagoes, organized by oceans and seas and then arranged alphabetically
 List of archipelagos by number of islands – List of archipelagos by number of islands, islets, reefs, coral reefs and cays
 Arm (geography) – A narrow extension of water extending out from a much larger body of water
 Atoll – Ring-shaped coral reef, generally formed over a subsiding oceanic volcano, with a central lagoon and perhaps islands around the rim
 Baïne – A pool of water between a beach and the mainland, parallel to the beach and connected to the sea at one or more points along its length
 Barrier island – A coastal dune landform that forms by wave and tidal action parallel to the mainland coast
 Bay – A recessed, coastal body of water connected to an ocean or lake
 Baymouth bar – A depositional feature as a result of longshore drift, a sandbank that partially or completely closes access to a bay.
 Beach – Area of loose particles at the edge of the sea or other body of water
 Beachrock – A friable to well-cemented sedimentary rock that consists of a variable mixture of gravel-, sand-, and silt-sized sediment that is cemented with carbonate minerals and has formed along a shoreline
 Beach cusps – Shoreline formations made up of various grades of sediment in an arc pattern
 Beach ridge – Wave-swept or wave-deposited ridge running parallel to a shoreline
 Bight (geography) – Wave-swept or wave-deposited ridge running parallel to a shoreline
 Blowhole (geology) – Hole at the top of a sea-cave which allows waves to force water or spray out of the hole
 Bodden – Brackish bodies of water often forming lagoons, along the southwestern shores of the Baltic Sea
 Brine pool – An area of high density brine collected in a depression on the ocean floor
 Cape (geography) – A large headland extending into a body of water, usually the sea
 Channel (geography) – A type of landform in which part of a body of water is confined to a relatively narrow but long region
 Chevron (land form) – A wedge-shaped sediment deposit observed on coastlines and continental interiors around the world
 Cliff – A vertical, or near vertical, rock face of substantial height
 Cliff-top dune – Dune that occurs on the top of a cliff
 Cliffed coast – A form of coast where the action of marine waves has formed steep cliffs that may or may not be precipitous
 Coast – Area where land meets the sea or ocean
 Coastal erosion – The loss or displacement of land along the coastline due to the action of waves, currents, tides. wind-driven water, waterborne ice, or other impacts of storms
 Coastal geography – The study of the region between the ocean and the land
 Coastal plain – An area of flat, low-lying land adjacent to a seacoast
 Coastal waterfall – A waterfall that plunges directly into the sea
 Cuspate foreland – Geographical features found on coastlines and lakeshores that are created primarily by longshore drift
 Dune – A hill of loose sand built by aeolian processes or the flow of water
 Estuary – A partially enclosed coastal body of brackish water with one or more rivers or streams flowing into it, and with a free connection to the open sea
 Fajã – A supratidal talus-platform geology of landslides or lava flows at the bottom of cliffs
 Faraglioni – Italian term used to refer to rock stacks
 Firth – Scottish word used for various coastal inlets and straits
 Fjard – A glacially formed, broad, shallow inlet
 Fjord – A long, narrow inlet with steep sides or cliffs, created by glacial activity
 Flat coast – Shoreline where the land descends gradually into the sea
 Gat (landform) – A relatively narrow but deep strait that is constantly eroded by currents flowing back and forth, such as tidal currents
 Gut (coastal geography) – A narrow coastal body of water, a channel or strait, usually one that is subject to strong tidal currents, or a small creek
 Headland – A landform extending into a body of water, often with significant height and drop
 Ingression coast – A generally low coastline that is shaped by the penetration of the sea as a result of crustal movements or a rise in the sea level
 Inlet – An indentation of a shoreline that often leads to an enclosed body of salt water, such as a sound, bay, lagoon, or marsh
 Island – Any piece of sub-continental land that is surrounded by water
 Island arc – Arc-shaped archipelago usually along a subduction zone
 Islet – A very small island
 Lagoon – A shallow body of water separated from a larger body of water by barrier islands or reefs
 Moaning sandbar – Harbor shoals that are known for tidal noises
 Narrows – A restricted land or water passage
 Natural arch – A natural rock formation where a rock arch forms
 Peninsula – A piece of land that is bordered by water on three sides but connected to mainland
 List of peninsulas – 
 Perched coastline – A fossil coastline currently above the present coastline
 Presque-isle – A peninsula with narrow connection to mainland
 Pseudo-atoll – An island that encircles a lagoon, either partially or completely that is not formed by subsidence or coral reefs
 Raised beach – A beach or wave-cut platform raised above the shoreline by a relative fall in the sea level
 Raised coral atoll – An atoll that has been lifted high enough above sea level by tectonic forces to protect it from scouring by storms
 Raised shoreline – An ancient shoreline exposed above current water level.
 Ria – A coastal inlet formed by the partial submergence of an unglaciated river valley
 Roadstead – An open anchorage affording some shelter, but less protection than a harbor
 Rocky shore – An intertidal area of coast where solid rock predominates
 Salt marsh – A coastal ecosystem in the upper coastal intertidal zone between land and open saltwater or brackish water that is regularly flooded by the tides
 Salt pannes and pools – Water retaining depressions located within salt and brackish marshes
 Sandbank represented by Shoal – 
 Sea cave – A cave formed by the wave action of the sea and located along present or former coastlines
 Shore – The fringe of land at the edge of a large body of water
 Skerry – A small rocky island
 Sound (geography) – A long, relatively wide body of water, connecting two larger bodies of water
 Spit (landform) – A coastal bar or beach landform deposited by longshore drift
 Stack (geology) – A geological landform consisting of a steep and often vertical column or columns of rock in the sea near a coast, formed by wave erosion
 Steep coast – A stretch of coastline where the mainland descends abruptly into the sea.
 Strait – A naturally formed, narrow, typically navigable waterway that connects two larger bodies of water
 Strand plain – A broad belt of sand along a shoreline with a surface exhibiting well-defined parallel or semi-parallel sand ridges separated by shallow swales
 Strandflat – Stretches of coast that have been inundated by the sea by a relative rise in sea levels from either isostacy or eustacy
 Submergent coastline – Stretches of coast that have been inundated by the sea by a relative rise in sea levels from either isostacy or eustacy
 Surge channel – A narrow inlet, usually on a rocky shoreline, and is formed by differential erosion of those rocks by coastal wave action
 Tide pool – A rocky pool on a seashore, separated from the seal at low tide, filled with seawater
 Tombolo – A deposition landform in which an island is connected to the mainland by a sandy isthmus

Oceanic (submarine) landforms 
 List of submarine topographical features – 
 Abyssal fan – Underwater geological structures associated with large-scale sediment deposition
 Abyssal hill – A small hill that rises from the floor of an abyssal plain
 Abyssal plain – Flat area on the deep ocean floor
 Aquatic sill – A sea floor barrier of relatively shallow depth restricting water movement between oceanic basins
 Archipelagic apron – A fan-shaped gently sloping region of sea floor found around oceanic islands
 Cold seep – Ocean floor area where hydrogen sulfide, methane and other hydrocarbon-rich fluid seepage occurs
 Continental margin – Zone of the ocean floor that separates the thin oceanic crust from thick continental crust
 Continental rise – An underwater feature connecting the continental slope and the abyssal plain
 Continental shelf – A portion of a continent that is submerged under an area of relatively shallow water known as a shelf sea
 Contourite – A sedimentary deposit commonly formed on continental rise to lower slope settings
 Coral reef – Outcrop of rock in the sea formed by the growth and deposit of stony coral skeletons
 Guyot – An isolated underwater volcanic mountain with a flat top
 Mid-ocean ridge – An underwater mountain system formed by plate tectonic spreading
 Ocean – A body of saline water that composes much of a planet's hydrosphere
 Oceanic basin – Large geologic basins that are below sea level
 Oceanic plateau – Relatively flat submarine region that rises well above the level of the ambient seabed
 Oceanic trench – Long and narrow depressions of the sea floor
 Passive margin – The transition between oceanic and continental lithosphere that is not an active plate margin
 Reef – A bar of rock, sand, coral or similar material, lying beneath the surface of water
 Sandbank represented by Shoal – 
 Sea – A large body of salt water surrounded in whole or in part by land
 Seabed – The bottom of the ocean
 Seamount – A mountain rising from the ocean seafloor that does not reach to the water's surface
 Shoal – A natural landform that rises from the bed of a body of water to near the surface and is covered by unconsolidated material
 Submarine canyon – A steep-sided valley cut into the seabed of the continental slope
 Submarine volcano – Underwater vents or fissures in the Earth's surface from which magma can erupt
 Undersea bank represented by Ocean bank – A part of the sea which is shallow compared to its surrounding area
 Undersea mountain range – Mountain ranges that are mostly or entirely under the surface of an ocean.

Coastal and oceanic landforms – specific cases – move to another section
 Cascadia Channel – An extensive deep-sea channel of the Pacific Ocean.
 Darwin Mounds – A large field of undersea sand mounds off the north west coast of Scotland
 Darwin's Arch – A natural rock arch feature situated to the southeast of Darwin Island in the Pacific Ocean
 Florida Platform – A flat geological feature with the emergent portion forming the Florida peninsula
 Hawaiian Islands – An archipelago in the North Pacific Ocean, currently administered by the US state of Hawaii (archipelago)
 Milwaukee Deep – The deepest part of the Atlantic Ocean – part of the Puerto Rico Trench
 Monterey Canyon – A submarine canyon in Monterey Bay, California 
 Northwest Atlantic Mid-Ocean Channel – The main body of a turbidity current system of channels and canyons running on the sea bottom from the Hudson Strait, through the Labrador Sea and ending at the Sohm Abyssal Plain
 Porcupine Seabight – A deep-water oceanic basin on the continental margin of the northeastern Atlantic

Oceans 
Ocean – A body of saline water that composes much of a planet's hydrosphere
 Arctic Ocean – The smallest and shallowest of the world's five major oceans, located in the north polar regions
 Atlantic Ocean – Ocean between Europe, Africa and the Americas
 Indian Ocean – The ocean between Africa, Asia, Australia and Antarctica (or the Southern Ocean)
 Pacific Ocean – Ocean between Asia and Australia in the west, the Americas in the east and Antarctica or the Southern Ocean in the south.
 Southern Ocean – The ocean around Antarctica
 World Ocean – The interconnected system of Earth's oceanic waters

Ocean zones 
Ocean zones – Not mutually exclusive
 Abyssal zone – Deep layer of the ocean between 4000 and 9000 metres
 Aphotic zone – The portion of a lake or ocean where less than 1% of sunlight penetrates (zones)
 Bathyal zone – Part of the pelagic zone that extends from a depth of 1000 to 4000 meters (3300 to 13000 feet) below the ocean surface. 
 Benthic zone – Ecological region at the lowest level of a body of water including the sediment surface and some sub-surface layers
 Dead zone (ecology) – Hypoxic areas in oceans and large lakes caused by excessive nutrient pollution
 Deep ocean water – Cold, salty water deep below the surface of Earth's oceans
 Deep sea – The lowest layer in the ocean, below the thermocline and above the seabed, at a depth of 1000 fathoms (1800 m) or more
 Demersal zone – The part of the water column near to the seabed and the benthos
 Fracture zone – A junction between oceanic crustal regions of different ages on the same plate left by a transform fault
 Gas hydrate stability zone – A zone and depth of the marine environment at which methane clathrates naturally exist in the Earth's crust
 Hadal zone – The deepest region of the ocean lying within oceanic trenches
 Intertidal zone – A junction between oceanic crustal regions of different ages on the same plate left by a transform fault
 Littoral zone – Part of a sea, lake or river that is close to the shore
 Mesopelagic zone – The part of the pelagic zone between the photic epipelagic above and the aphotic bathypelagic below
 Neritic zone – The relatively shallow part of the ocean above the drop-off of the continental shelf
 Oceanic zone – The part of the ocean beyond the continental shelf
 Pelagic zone – Sea water that is neither close to the bottom nor near the shore
 Photic zone – The uppermost layer of water in a lake or ocean that is exposed to sunlight more than 1% of surface illumination
 Subduction zone – Convergent tectonic plate boundaries where one plate moves under the other
 Supralittoral zone – The area above the spring high tide line that is regularly splashed, but not submerged by ocean water
 Surf zone – The nearshore zone where wave water comes onto the shore
 Swash – A turbulent layer of water that washes up on the beach after an incoming wave has broken

Seas 
Sea – A large body of salt water surrounded in whole or in part by land
 List of seas – Large divisions of the World Ocean, including areas of water variously named as gulfs, bights, bays, and straits.
 Marginal sea – Large divisions of the World Ocean, partly bordered by land.
 Sargasso Sea – A sea defined by currents in the gyre in the middle of the North Atlantic Ocean

Marginal seas of the Atlantic coasts of the Americas (coast wise north to south) 
 Davis Strait – A northern arm of the Labrador Sea that lies between mid-western Greenland and Nunavut, Canada's Baffin Island
 Labrador Sea – An arm of the North Atlantic Ocean between the Labrador Peninsula and Greenland
 Gulf of St. Lawrence – The outlet of the North American Great Lakes via the Saint Lawrence River into the Atlantic Ocean
 Gulf of Maine – A large gulf of the Atlantic Ocean on the east coast of North America
 Bay of Fundy – A bay on the east coast of North America between New Brunswick and Nova Scotia
 Massachusetts Bay – A bay on the Atlantic Ocean that forms part of the central coastline of the Commonwealth of Massachusetts.
 Cape Cod Bay – A large bay of the Atlantic Ocean adjacent to the U.S. state of Massachusetts
 Nantucket Sound – A roughly triangular area of the Atlantic Ocean offshore from the U.S. state of Massachusetts
 Vineyard Sound – The stretch of the Atlantic Ocean which separates the Elizabeth Islands and the southwestern part of Cape Cod from the island of Martha's Vineyard
 Buzzards Bay – A bay on the coast of Massachusetts, United States
 Narragansett Bay – A bay and estuary on the north side of Rhode Island Sound
 Rhode Island Sound – A strait off the coast of Rhode Island, United States
 Block Island Sound – A strait in the Atlantic Ocean separating Block Island from the coast of mainland Rhode Island in the United States
 
 Long Island Sound – A tidal estuary on the east coast of the United States
 Shelter Island Sound – A body of water in Suffolk County, New York, at the eastern end of Long Island
 
 Peconic Bay – The parent name for two bays between the North Fork and South Fork of Long Island in the U.S. state of New York

 
 Gardiners Bay – A small arm of the Atlantic Ocean in the U.S. state of New York at the eastern end of Long Island
 
 
 
 
 
 
 
 
 Fort Pond Bay – A bay off Long Island Sound at Montauk, New York
 
 New York Bay – The marine areas surrounding the river mouth of the Hudson River into the Atlantic Ocean
 
 
 Jamaica Bay – Bay on the southern side of Long Island, New York
 Raritan Bay – The southern portion of Lower New York Bay between the U.S. states of New York and New Jersey

 Delaware Bay – The estuary outlet of the Delaware River on the Northeast seaboard of the United States
 Chesapeake Bay – An estuary in the U.S. states of Maryland, Delaware, District of Columbia, and Virginia
 Albemarle Sound – An estuary on the coast of North Carolina, United States
 Pamlico Sound – The largest lagoon along the North American East Coast
 Gulf of Mexico – An ocean basin and marginal sea of the Atlantic Ocean, largely surrounded by the North American continent
 Florida Bay – The bay between the southern end of the Florida mainland and the Florida Keys in the United States
 Tampa Bay – Estuary and natural harbor in Florida, off the Gulf of Mexico
 Pensacola Bay – A bay in the northwestern part of Florida, United States, known as the Florida Panhandle
 Mobile Bay – An inlet of the Gulf of Mexico, lying within the state of Alabama in the United States
 Vermillion Bay – An inlet of the Gulf of Mexico, to which it is connected to the south by a narrow strait called Southwest Pass
 Bay of Campeche – A bight in the southern area of the Gulf of Mexico
 Caribbean – A sea of the Atlantic Ocean bounded by North, Central, and South America
 Gulf of Gonâve (Haiti) – A large gulf along the western coast of Haiti
 Gulf of Honduras – A large inlet of the Caribbean Sea, indenting the coasts of Belize, Guatemala, and Honduras.
 Golfo de los Mosquitos – A gulf on the north coast of Panama, extending from the Valiente Peninsula in Bocas del Toro, past the north coast of Veraguas to the province of Colón, Panama
 Gulf of Venezuela – A gulf of the Caribbean Sea bounded by the Venezuelan states of Zulia and Falcón and by Guajira Department, Colombia
 Gulf of Paria – A shallow semi-enclosed inland sea between the island of Trinidad and the east coast of Venezuela
 Gulf of Darién – The southernmost region of the Caribbean Sea, located north and east of the border between Panama and Colombia
 Argentine Sea – The sea within the continental shelf off the Argentine mainland

Marginal seas of the Atlantic coasts of Europe, Africa, and Asia 
 Norwegian Sea – A marginal sea in the North Atlantic Ocean, northwest of Norway
 North Sea – A marginal sea of the Atlantic Ocean located between the United Kingdom, Denmark, Norway, Germany, the Netherlands, Belgium and France
 Wadden Sea – An intertidal zone in the southeastern part of the North Sea (Netherlands, Germany and Denmark)
 Baltic Sea – A sea in Northern Europe bounded by the Scandinavian Peninsula, the mainland of Europe, and the Danish islands
 Archipelago Sea – A part of the Baltic Sea between the Gulf of Bothnia, the Gulf of Finland and the Sea of Åland, within Finnish territorial waters
 Bothnian Sea – Southern part of the Gulf of Bothnia
 Central Baltic Sea – 
 Gulf of Riga – A bay of the Baltic Sea between Latvia and Estonia
 Øresund Strait – The strait between Denmark and Sweden
 Sea of Åland – The sea between the Finnish Åland islands and the Swedish mainland, part of the Baltic Sea
 English Channel – Arm of the Atlantic Ocean that separates southern England from northern France
 Irish Sea – Sea which separates the islands of Ireland and Great Britain
 Celtic Sea – Part of the Atlantic Ocean south of Ireland, and west of the Bristol Channel, English Channel and Bay of Biscay over the continental shelf
 Bay of Biscay – Gulf of the northeast Atlantic Ocean located south of the Celtic Sea off the west coast of France and the south coast of Spain
 Cantabrian Sea – Sea in the southern Bay of Biscay off the coast of Spain
 Mediterranean – Sea connected to the Atlantic Ocean between Europe, Africa and Asia
 Adriatic Sea – Body of water between the Italian Peninsula and the Balkan Peninsula
 Aegean Sea – Part of the Mediterranean Sea between the Greek and Anatolian peninsulas
 Argolic Gulf – A gulf of the Aegean Sea off the east coast of the Peloponnese, Greece
 Myrtoan Sea – Part of the Mediterranean Sea between the Cyclades and the Peleponnese
 North Euboean Gulf – A gulf of the Aegean Sea that separates the northern part of the island Euboea from the mainland of Central Greece
 Saronic Gulf – Gulf in the Aegean sea between the peninsulas of Attica and Argolis
 Sea of Crete – Southern part of the Aegean Sea, north of Crete, east of Kythera, Antikythera, and the Ionian Sea, southeast of the Myrtoan Sea, south of the Cyclades, and west of the Dodecanese islands
 South Euboean Gulf – A gulf in Central Greece, between the island of Euboea and the Greek mainland
 Icarian Sea – The part of the Aegean Sea to the south of Chios, to the east of the Eastern Cyclades and west of Anatolia
 Thermaic Gulf – A gulf in the northwest corner of the Aegean sea
 Thracian Sea – Northernmost part of the Aegean sea
 Alboran Sea – The westernmost portion of the Mediterranean Sea, lying between the Iberian Peninsula and the north of Africa
 Balearic (Catalan) Sea – Part of the Mediterranean Sea near the Balearic Islands
 Gulf of Lion – A wide embayment of the Mediterranean coastline of Languedoc-Roussillon and Provence in France
 Gulf of Sirte – A body of water in the Mediterranean Sea on the northern coast of Libya
 Ionian Sea – Part of the Mediterranean Sea south of the Adriatic Sea
 Gulf of Corinth – A deep inlet of the Ionian Sea separating the Peloponnese from western mainland Greece
 Levantine Sea – The easternmost part of the Mediterranean Sea

 Libyan Sea – The portion of the Mediterranean Sea north of the African coast of ancient Libya
 Ligurian Sea – Arm of the Mediterranean Sea between the Italian Riviera (Liguria) and the island of Corsica
 Gulf of Genoa – The northernmost part of the Ligurian Sea
 Sea of Sardinia – A body of water in the Mediterranean Sea between the Spanish archipelago of Balearic Islands and the Italian island of Sardinia
 Sea of Sicily – The strait between Sicily and Tunisia
 Inland Sea, Gozo – A lagoon of seawater on the island of Gozo linked to the Mediterranean Sea through an opening formed by a narrow natural arch
 Tyrrhenian Sea – Part of the Mediterranean Sea off the western coast of Italy
 Sea of Marmara – Inland sea, entirely within the borders of Turkey, between the Mediterranean Sea and the Black Sea
 Black Sea – Marginal sea of the Atlantic Ocean between Europe and Asia
 Sea of Azov – Sea on the south of Eastern Europe linked to the Black Sea
 Gulf of Guinea – The northeasternmost part of the tropical Atlantic Ocean between Cape Lopez in Gabon, north and west to Cape Palmas in Liberia

Marginal seas of the Northern Atlantic islands (east to west) 
 Irminger Sea – A marginal sea of the North Atlantic Ocean southeast of Greenland between the Denmark Strait and the Labrador Sea
 Denmark Strait – Strait between Greenland and Iceland
 Irish Sea – Sea which separates the islands of Ireland and Great Britain
 Inner Seas off the West Coast of Scotland – A marine area between the Scottish mainland, the Outer Hebrides and Ireland
 Sea of the Hebrides – A portion of the North Atlantic Ocean, off the coast of western Scotland

Marginal seas of the Arctic Ocean (clockwise from 180°) 
 Chukchi Sea – A marginal sea of the Arctic Ocean north of the Bering Strait
 East Siberian Sea – A marginal sea in the Arctic Ocean north of Siberia
 Laptev Sea – Marginal sea in the Arctic Ocean north of Siberia between the Kara Sea and the East Siberian Sea
 Kara Sea – A marginal sea of the Arctic Ocean north of Siberia between Novaya Zemlya and Severnaya Zemlya
 Barents Sea – A marginal sea of the Arctic Ocean north of Siberia between Novaya Zemlya and Severnaya Zemlya
 Pechora Sea – A marginal sea at the northwest of Russia, the southeastern part of the Barents Sea
 White Sea – A marginal sea at the northwest of Russia, the southeastern part of the Barents Sea
 Queen Victoria Sea – A body of water in the Arctic Ocean, stretching from northeast of Svalbard to northwest Franz Josef Land
 Wandel Sea – A body of water in the Arctic Ocean from northeast of Greenland to Svalbard
 Greenland Sea – A body of water in the Arctic Ocean from northeast of Greenland to Svalbard
 Lincoln Sea (recognized by IHO but not IMO) – A part of the Arctic Ocean from Cape Columbia, Canada, in the west to Cape Morris Jesup, Greenland, in the east
 Baffin Bay – A marginal sea between Greenland and Baffin Island, Canada
 Northwest Passage – 
 Prince Gustaf Adolf Sea – A marginal sea of the Arctic Ocean located in Qikiqtaaluk Region, Nunavut, Canada
 Amundsen Gulf – A gulf in Northwest Territories, Canada
 (more to be listed) 
 Hudson Strait – Strait connecting the Atlantic Ocean to Hudson Bay in Canada
 Hudson Bay – A large body of saltwater in northeastern Canada that drains much of north-central North America
 James Bay – A bay on the southern end of the Hudson Bay, Canada
 Beaufort Sea – A marginal sea of the Arctic Ocean north of the Northwest Territories, the Yukon, and Alaska

Marginal seas of the Indian Ocean 
 Andaman Sea – A marginal sea of the eastern Indian Ocean between the Andaman and Nicobar Islands to the west and Myanmar, Thailand, and the Malay Peninsula to the east
 Gulf of Martaban – An arm of the Andaman Sea in the southern part of Burma
 Arabian Sea – A marginal sea of the northern Indian Ocean between the Arabian Peninsula and India
 Bay of Bengal – Northeastern part of the Indian Ocean between India and the Andaman and Nicobar Islands
 Gulf of Aden – A gulf between Somalia and Djibouti in Africa and Yemen in the Arabian Peninsula
 Gulf of Oman – Strait that connects the Arabian Sea with the Strait of Hormuz
 Laccadive Sea – A body of water bordering India, the Maldives, and Sri Lanka.
 Mozambique Channel – Indian Ocean strait between Madagascar and Mozambique
 Persian Gulf – An arm of the Indian Ocean in western Asia
 Red Sea – Arm of the Indian Ocean between Arabia and Africa
 Timor Sea – A sea bounded to the north by the island of Timor, to the east by the Arafura Sea, to the south by Australia

Marginal seas of the Pacific coast of the Americas 
 Bering Sea – Marginal sea of the Pacific Ocean off the coast of Alaska, Eastern Russia and the Aleutian Islands
 Chilean Sea – The portion of the Pacific Ocean lying west of the Chilean mainland
 Sea of Chiloé – A marginal sea of the coast of Chile that is separated from the Pacific Ocean by Chiloé Island
 Gulf of Alaska – An arm of the Pacific Ocean south of Alaska, from the Alaska Peninsula and Kodiak Island in the west to the Alexander Archipelago in the east
 Gulf of California (also known as the Sea of Cortés) – A gulf of the Pacific Ocean on the coast of Mexico between Baja California and the mainland
 Mar de Grau – The body of water in the Pacific Ocean under the control of the South American country of Peru.
 Salish Sea – A group of coastal waterways in southwest British Columbia and northwest Washington State

Marginal seas of the Pacific coasts of Asia and Oceania 
 Arafura Sea – Marginal sea between Australia and Indonesian New Guinea
 Bali Sea – The body of water north of the island of Bali and south of Kangean Island in Indonesia
 Banda Sea – A sea between Sulawesi and Maluku
 Bismarck Sea – Marginal sea in the southwestern Pacific Ocean northeast of the island of New Guinea and south of the Bismarck Archipelago and the Admiralty Islands
 Bohai Sea – The innermost gulf of the Yellow Sea and Korea Bay on the coast of Northeastern and North China
 Bohol Sea (also known as the Mindanao Sea) – Marginal sea between the Visayas and Mindanao in the Philippines
 Camotes Sea – A small sea in the Philippine archipelago, bordered by the islands Leyte, Bohol and Cebu
 Celebes Sea – A marginal sea of the Pacific Ocean between the Sulu Archipelago, Mindanao Island, the Sangihe Islands, Sulawesi and Kalimantan
 Ceram Sea – One of several small seas between the scattered islands of Indonesia
 Coral Sea – A marginal sea of the South Pacific off the northeast coast of Australia
 East China Sea – A marginal sea of the Pacific Ocean between the south of Korea, the south of Kyushu, Japan, the Ryukyu islands and mainland China
 Flores Sea – A marginal sea in Indonesia between Sulawesi and the Sunda Islands of Flores and Sumbawa
 Gulf of Carpentaria – A large, shallow sea enclosed on three sides by northern Australia and bounded on the north by the Arafura Sea
 Gulf of Thailand – A shallow inlet in the western part of the South China and Eastern Archipelagic Seas
 Halmahera Sea – A marginal sea in the central eastern part of the Australasian Mediterranean Sea
 Java Sea – A marginal sea located between Java and Kalimantan, in Indonesia
 Koro Sea – A sea in the Pacific Ocean between Viti Levu island, Fiji to the west and the Lau Islands to the east
 Molucca Sea – A marginal sea bordered by the Indonesian Islands of Sulawesi to the west, Halmahera to the east, and the Sula Islands to the south
 Philippine Sea – A marginal sea bordered by the Indonesian Islands of Sulawesi to the west, Halmahera to the east, and the Sula Islands to the south
 Savu Sea – A small sea within Indonesia between the islands Savu, Rai Jua, Rote, Timor and Sumba
 Sea of Japan – Marginal sea between Japan, Russia and Korea
 Sea of Okhotsk – A marginal sea of the western Pacific Ocean, between the Kamchatka Peninsula, the Kuril Islands, the island of Hokkaido, the island of Sakhalin, and eastern Siberian coast
 Seto Inland Sea – A marginal sea between Honshū, Shikoku, and Kyūshū
 Sibuyan Sea – A small sea in the Philippines that separates the Visayas from the northern Philippine island of Luzon
 Solomon Sea – A sea in the Pacific Ocean between Papua New Guinea and the Solomon Islands
 South China Sea – A marginal sea of the Pacific Ocean from the Karimata and Malacca Straits to the Strait of Taiwan
 Sulu Sea – A sea in the Philippines between Palawan, the Sulu Archipelago, Borneo and Visayas
 Tasman Sea – A marginal sea of the South Pacific between Australia and New Zealand
 Visayan Sea – A sea in the Philippines between Masbate, Leyte, Cebu, Negros and Panay
 Yellow Sea – Sea in Northeast Asia between China and Korea

Marginal seas of the Southern Ocean 
 Amundsen Sea – An arm of the Southern Ocean off Marie Byrd Land in western Antarctica between Cape Flying Fish to the east and Cape Dart on Siple Island to the west
 Bass Strait – Sea strait between the Australian mainland and Tasmania
 Bellingshausen Sea – A part of the Southern Ocean along the west side of the Antarctic Peninsula, west of Alexander Island, east of Cape Flying Fish on Thurston Island
 Cooperation Sea – A proposed sea name for part of the Southern Ocean, between Enderby Land and West Ice Shelf
 Cosmonauts Sea – A proposed name for part of the Southern Ocean, off the Prince Olav Coast and Enderby Land, Antarctica, between about 30°E and 50°E
 Davis Sea – A marginal sea along the coast of East Antarctica between West Ice Shelf and Shackleton Ice Shelf
 D'Urville Sea – A marginal sea of the Southern Ocean, north of the coast of Adélie Land, East Antarctica
 Drake Passage – body of water between South America and the South Shetland Islands of Antarctica
 Great Australian Bight – Oceanic bight off the central and western portions of the southern coastline of mainland Australia
 Gulf St Vincent – A large inlet of water on the southern coast of South Australia between the Yorke Peninsula and the Fleurieu Peninsula
 Investigator Strait – A body of water in South Australia lying between the Yorke Peninsula, on the Australian mainland, and Kangaroo Island
 King Haakon VII Sea – A proposed name for part of the Southern Ocean on the coast of East Antarctica
 Lazarev Sea – A proposed name for a marginal sea of the Southern Ocean
 Mawson Sea – A proposed sea name along the Queen Mary Land coast of East Antarctica east of the Shackleton Ice Shelf
 Riiser-Larsen Sea – One of the marginal seas in the Southern Ocean off East Antarctica and south of the Indian Ocean
 Ross Sea – A deep bay of the Southern Ocean in Antarctica
 Scotia Sea – A sea at the northern edge of the Southern Ocean at its boundary with the South Atlantic Ocean. It is bounded on the west by the Drake Passage and on the north, east, and south by the Scotia Arc
 Somov Sea – A proposed name for part of the Southern Ocean north of Oates Coast, Victoria Land, and of George V Coast of East Antarctica
 Spencer Gulf – A large inlet in South Australia between the Eyre Peninsula and the Yorke Peninsula
 Weddell Sea – Part of the Southern Ocean between Coats Land and the Antarctic Peninsula

Sea ice 
Sea ice – Ice formed from frozen seawater
 Antarctic sea ice – Records made for navigational safety and environmental monitoring
 Arctic ice pack – The sea ice cover of the Arctic Ocean and its vicinity
 Arctic sea ice decline – The sea ice loss observed in recent decades in the Arctic Ocean
 Arctic sea ice ecology and history – 
 Blue iceberg – An iceberg with a blue colour, often due to very low air content
 Brine rejection – Process by which salts are expelled from freezing water
 Brinicle – A downward growing hollow tube of ice enclosing a plume of descending brine that is formed beneath developing sea ice
 Climate change adaptation in Greenland – 
 Climate change in the Arctic – The effects of global warming in the Arctic
 Congelation ice – Ice that forms on the bottom of an established ice cover
 Drift ice – Sea ice that is not attached to land and may move on the sea surface in response to wind and ocean currents
 Drift station – A temporary or semi-permanent facility built on an ice floe
 Drifting ice station – Research stations built on the ice of the high latitudes of the Arctic Ocean
 Fast ice – Sea ice that is connected to the coastline, to the sea floor along shoals or to grounded icebergs
 Finger rafting – Compression overlapping of floating ice cover in alternating overthrusts and underthrusts
 Finnish-Swedish ice class – An ice class assigned to a vessel operating in first-year ice in the Baltic Sea
 Flaw lead – A waterway opening between pack ice and fast ice
 Frazil ice – A collection of loose, randomly oriented, plate or discoid ice crystals formed in supercooled turbulent water
 Grease ice – A thin, soupy layer of frazil crystals clumped together, which makes the ocean surface resemble an oil slick
 Iceberg – A large piece of freshwater ice broken off a glacier or ice shelf and floating in open water
 Ice bridge – A frozen natural structure formed over seas, bays, rivers or lake surfaces
 Ice class – A notation assigned by a classification society or a national authority to denote the additional level of strengthening and other arrangements that enable a ship to navigate through sea ice
 Ice floe – A large pack of floating ice
 Ice mélange – A mixture of sea ice types, icebergs, and snow without a clearly defined floe
 Ice pier – A man-made structure used to assist the unloading of ships in Antarctica
 Ice rafting – The transport of various materials by drifting ice
 Ice volcano – A conical mound of ice formed over a terrestrial lake via the eruption of water and slush through an ice shelf
 Lead (sea ice) – A large fracture in sea ice creating a navigable waterway
 Measurement of sea ice – Records made for navigational safety and environmental monitoring 
 Melt pond – Pools of open water that form on sea ice in the warmer months of spring and summer
 Nilas – 
 Pancake ice – A form of ice that consists of round pieces of ice with diameters ranging from 30 centimetres (12 in) to 3 metres
 Polar Class – The ice class assigned to a ship by a classification society based on the Unified Requirements for Polar Class Ships
 Polar seas – A collective term for the Arctic Ocean and the southern part of the Southern Ocean
 Polynya – An area of unfrozen sea within the ice pack
 Pressure ridge (ice) – A ridge formed in pack ice by accumulation of ice blocks in the convergence between floes
 Seabed gouging by ice – A process that occurs when floating ice features drift into shallower areas and their bottom comes into contact with and drags along a softer seabed
 Sea ice concentration – The area of sea ice relative to the total area at a given point in the ocean
 Sea ice emissivity modelling – 
 Sea ice growth processes – 
 Sea ice microbial communities – Groups of microorganisms living within and at the interfaces of sea ice
 Sea ice thickness – 
 Stamukha – A grounded pressure ridge that typically develops along the boundary between fast ice and the drifting pack ice
 Strudel (ice) – A vertical hole in sea ice through which downward jet-like, buoyancy-driven drainage of flood water is thought to occur
 Zhubov scale – A scale for reporting polar sea ice coverage

Icebergs 
Iceberg – A large piece of freshwater ice broken off a glacier or ice shelf and floating in open water
 List of recorded icebergs by area – 
 Fletcher's Ice Island – A thick, tabular iceberg discovered by U.S. Air Force Colonel Joseph O. Fletcher, used as a manned scientific station in the Arctic for several years
 Iceberg A-38 – A large iceberg that split from the Filchner-Ronne Ice Shelf in Antarctica in 1998
 Iceberg A-68 – Antarctic iceberg from the Larsen C Ice Shelf in July 2017
 Iceberg B-9 – Antarctic iceberg that calved in 1987
 Iceberg B-15 – Largest recorded iceberg. Calved from the Ross Ice Shelf of Antarctica in March 2000
 Iceberg B-17B – Antarctic iceberg that calved off the Ross Ice Shelf in 1999.
 Iceberg B-31 – Antarctic iceberg calved from the Pine Island Glacier in 2013
 Iceberg C-19 – Iceberg that calved from the Ross Ice Shelf in May 2002
 Iceberg D-16 – Antarctic iceberg calved from the Fimbul Ice Shelf in 2006

Sea level 
Sea level – Average level for the surface of the ocean at any given geographical position on the planetary surface
 Eustatic sea level – The distance from the center of the earth to the sea surface
 Global Sea Level Observing System – An Intergovernmental Oceanographic Commission program to measure sea level globally for long-term climate change studies
 Meltwater pulse 1A – A period of rapid post-glacial sea level rise
 Meltwater pulse 1B – A period of either rapid or just accelerated post-glacial sea level rise
 National Tidal and Sea Level Facility – Organisation responsible for monitoring sea levels in the UK
 North West Shelf Operational Oceanographic System – Facility that monitors physical, sedimentological and ecological variables for the North Sea area
 Past sea level – Sea level variations over geological time scales
 Permanent Service for Mean Sea Level – A repository for tide gauge data used in the measurement of long-term sea level change
 Sea level rise – The current trend for sea levels to rise over the long term
 Sea-level curve – The graphic representation of changes of sea level through geological history
 UK National Tide Gauge Network – Part of the National Tidal and Sea Level Facility

Tides 
Tide – The periodic change of sea levels caused by the gravitational and inertial effects of the Moon, the Sun and the rotation of the Earth
 Amphidromic point – A point of zero amplitude of one harmonic constituent of the tide
 Amsterdam Ordnance Datum – A vertical datum in use in large parts of Western Europe, originally created for use in the Netherlands
 Chart datum – The level of water from which depths displayed on a nautical chart are measured
 Discourse on the Tides – An essay by Galileo Galilei in 1616 that attempted to explain the motion of Earth's tides as a consequence of Earth's rotation and revolution around the sun
 Dory Rips – Extreme tidal agitation of waters in the Bay of Fundy off the headland of Cape d'Or in Nova Scotia, Canada.
 Earth tide – Displacement of the solid earth's surface caused by the gravity of the Moon and Sun
 Head of tide – The farthest point upstream where a river is affected by tidal fluctuations
 Horizontal Falls – A tidal phenomenon in Western Australia where the tide rises and falls faster on one side of a gap than the other, creating a waterfall up to 5m high on a spring tide
 Internal tide – Internal waves at a tidal frequency generated as surface tides move stratified water up and down a slope
 Intertidal zone – The area of coast between low and high tide marks
 Jack Sound – A body of water between the island of Skomer and the Pembrokeshire mainland with a strong tidal race
 King tide – A colloquial term for an especially high spring tide, such as a perigean spring tide.
 Long period tide – Gravitational tides, typically with amplitudes of a few centimetres or less and periods longer than one day, generated by changes in the Earth's orientation relative to the Sun, Moon, and Jupiter
 Lunitidal interval – The time lag from the Moon passing overhead, to the next high or low tide.
 Perigean spring tide – A tide that occurs three or four times per year when the Moon's perigee coincides with a spring tide
 Rip tide – A strong, offshore current that is caused by the tide pulling water through an inlet along a barrier beach, at a lagoon or inland marina where tide water flows steadily out to sea during ebb tide
 Rule of twelfths – An approximation to a sine curve used as a rule of thumb for estimating a changing quantity where both the quantity and the steps are easily divisible by 12
 Slack water – A short period in a body of tidal water when the water is completely unstressed, and there is no movement either way in the tidal stream, and which occurs before the direction of the tidal stream reverses
 Storm surge Rise of water surface associated with a low pressure weather system
 Theory of tides – The science of interpretation and prediction of deformations of astronomical bodies and their atmospheres and oceans under the gravitational loading of other astronomical bodies
 Tidal atlas – A graphical representation of the geographical distribution of the strength and direction of tidal currents at intervals during the tidal cycle
 Tidal bore – A hydrodynamic phenomenon in which the leading edge of the incoming tide forms a wave (or waves) of water that travels up a river or narrow bay against the direction of the river or bay's current.
 Tidal diamond – Symbols on British admiralty charts that indicate the direction and speed of tidal streams
 Tidal flooding – The temporary inundation of low-lying areas during exceptionally high tide events
 Tidal island – Land which is connected to the mainland by a causeway which is covered by high tide and exposed at low tide
 Tidal power – Technology to convert the energy from tides into useful forms of power
 Tidal prism – The volume of water in an estuary or inlet between mean high tide and mean low tide,
 Tidal race – A fast-moving tidal flow passing through a constriction, forming waves, eddies and strong currents
 Tidal range – The vertical difference between the high tide and the succeeding low tide
 Tidal resonance – Phenomenon that occurs when the tide excites a resonant mode of a part of an ocean, producing a higher tidal range
 Tidal river – River where flow and level are influenced by tides
 Tidal triggering of earthquakes – The idea that tidal forces may induce seismicity
 Tide gauge – A device for measuring the change in sea level relative to a datum
 Tideline – Surface border where two currents in the ocean converge. Driftwood, floating seaweed, foam, and other floating debris may accumulate
 Tide pool – A rocky pool on a seashore, separated from the sea at low tide, filled with seawater
 Tide-predicting machine – A mechanical analogue computer, constructed and set up to predict the ebb and flow of sea tides and the variations in their heights
 Tide-Predicting Machine No. 2 – A special-purpose mechanical analogue computer used by the U.S. Coast and Geodetic Survey to compute the height and time of high and low tides for specific locations
 Tide table – Tabulated data used for tidal prediction which show the daily times and heights of high water and low water, usually for a particular location
 Tombolo – A deposition landform in which an island is connected to the mainland by a sandy isthmus
 Vanishing island – Any permanent island which is exposed at low tide but is submersed at high tide
 Vertical Offshore Reference Frames (VORF) – is a set of high resolution surfaces which together define the vertical datum for hydrographic surveying and charting in the United Kingdom and Ireland
 Whirlpool – Body of rotating water produced by the meeting of opposing currents

Storm tides 
Storm surge Rise of water surface associated with a low pressure weather system
 Storm tides of the North Sea – Tides in the North Sea with abnormally high flood period caused by storms
 1978 North Sea storm surge – A storm surge which occurred over 11–12 January causing extensive coastal flooding and considerable damage on the east coast of England between the Humber and Kent
 Burchardi flood – A storm tide that struck the North Sea coast of North Frisia and Dithmarschen on the night between 11 and 12 October 1634
 Christmas Flood of 1717 – December 1717 North Sea storm
 Cyclone Berit – A very strong European windstorm in mid-November 2011
 Cyclone Xaver – A winter storm that affected northern Europe in 2013
 Cymbrian flood – A legendary large-scale incursion of the sea in the region of the Jutland peninsula in the period 120 to 114 BC, resulting in a permanent alteration of the coastline with much land lost
 February flood of 1825 – Storm surge flood on the North Sea coast of Germany and the Netherlands
 Gale of January 1976 – An extratropical cyclone and storm surge which occurred over January 1976
 North Sea flood of 1953 – Late January-early February 1953 North sea flood storm
 North Sea flood of 1962 – A natural disaster affecting mainly the coastal regions of Germany
 North Sea flood of 2007 – A European windstorm which affected northern and western Europe in early November 2007
 St. Elizabeth's flood (1404) – A flood on the coast of the North Sea
 St. Elizabeth's flood (1421) – A flooding of the Grote Hollandse Waard, an area in what is now the Netherlands
 Saint Marcellus's flood – A storm surge in the North Sea 1362
 St. Peter's flood – Two separate storm tides that struck the coasts of Netherlands and Northern Germany in 1651
 South England flood of February 1287 – A storm and storm surge that hit the southern coast of England with such ferocity that whole areas of coastline were redrawn
 St. Lucia's flood – A storm tide that affected the Netherlands and Northern Germany on 14 December 1287
 1928 Thames flood – A storm tide that affected the Netherlands and Northern Germany on 14 December 1287

Tidal bores 
Tidal bore – A hydrodynamic phenomenon in which the leading edge of the incoming tide forms a wave (or waves) of water that travels up a river or narrow bay against the direction of the river or bay's current.
 Arnside Bore – A tidal bore on the estuary of the River Kent in England, United Kingdom
 Mearim River – A river in Maranhão state of northern Brazil with a tidal bore
 Petitcodiac River – A river in south-eastern New Brunswick, Canada
 Pororoca – A tidal bore, with waves up to 4 metres high that travel as much as 800 km inland upstream on the Amazon River and adjacent rivers
 Qiantang River – An East Chinese river that originates in the border region of Anhui and Jiangxi provinces and has the world's largest tidal bore
 Severn bore – A tidal bore seen on the tidal reaches of the River Severn in south western England
 Sri Aman – Town in east Malaysia on the Batang Lupar River, known for its daily tidal bore
 Trent Aegir – A tidal bore on the River Trent in England

Tidal islands 
Tidal island – Land which is connected to the mainland by a causeway which is covered by high tide and exposed at low tide
 Ap Lei Pai – An uninhabited island in Hong Kong, linked to the south of Ap Lei Chau by a tombolo
 Elizabeth Castle – A castle on a tidal island in the parish of Saint Helier, Jersey
 La Motte, Jersey – A tidal island and listed archaeological site in Jersey
 Lihou – A small tidal island, on the west coast of Guernsey, Channel Islands
 Ma Shi Chau – A tidal island of Hong Kong
 Mandø – Danish Wadden Sea island
 Moturoa / Rabbit Island – A small island in the southernmost part of the Tasman Bay, in the northern coast of New Zealand's South Island
 Naaz islands – Two tidal islands in the Persian gulf, on the shore of Qeshm island
 Penguin Island (Western Australia) – A tidal island near Perth, Western Australia
 Îlot Saint-Michel – An uninhabited island in the English Channel off the coast of Brittany in Côtes-d'Armor, France

Tidal islands of Canada 
 Micou's Island, Nova Scotia – A tidal island in the Glen Haven community near the eastern shore of St. Margarets Bay, Nova Scotia, Canada
 Ministers Island – Canadian tidal island in New Brunswick's Passamaquoddy Bay near the town of St. Andrews
 Sandy Point, Newfoundland and Labrador – Tidal island on the west coast of Newfoundland
 Wedge Island (Nova Scotia) – A tidal island near Liscomb, Nova Scotia.

Tidal islands of France 
 Grand Bé – Tidal island near Saint-Malo in Ille-et-Vilaine, France
 Petit Bé – A tidal island near Saint-Malo in Ille-et-Vilaine, France
 Fort de Bertheaume – A fort in Plougonvelin, in the Department of Finistère, France. It is located on a tidal island
 Fort Louvois – Fortification built on a tidal island in Bourcefranc-le-Chapus in the department of Charente-Maritime, France
 Fort National – A fort on a tidal island a few hundred metres off the walled city of Saint-Malo
 Mont Saint-Michel – An island and mainland commune in Normandy, France
 Noirmoutier – An island off the coast of France in the Vendée department.
 Tatihou – Tidal island of Normandy in France
 Tombelaine – A small tidal island in Manche, France
 Tristan Island – Tidal island in Finistère, France

Tidal islands of Germany 
 Langeneß – 
 Nordstrandischmoor – A hallig in the Wadden Sea – a tidal island
 Öland (Frisian island) –

Tidal islands of Ireland 
 Coney Island, County Sligo – Tidal island in County Sligo, Ireland
 Inishkeel – 
 Omey Island – A tidal island situated near Claddaghduff on the western edge of Connemara in County Galway, Ireland

Tidal islands of England 
 Asparagus Island – A small tidal island on the eastern side of Mount's Bay, within the parish of Mullion, Cornwall
 Burgh Island – A tidal island on the coast of South Devon in England
 Burrow Island – A tidal island in Gosport overlooking Portsmouth
 Chiswick Eyot – Tidal island in the River Thames
 Dova Haw – A small tidal island off the coast of Cumbria, England
 Gugh – Tidal island of the isles of Scilly
 Headin Haw – A small tidal island off the coast of Cumbria, England
 Hilbre Islands – Three tidal islands at the mouth of the estuary of the River Dee, England
 Horsey Island – Tidal island in Essex, England
 Lindisfarne – Tidal island in North East England
 Mersea Island – A tidal island in Essex, England
 Northey Island – Tidal island in the estuary of the River Blackwater, Essex
 Osea Island – Tidal island in the estuary of the River Blackwater, Essex, East England
 Piel Island – Tidal island in Cumbria, United Kingdom
 St Michael's Mount – Tidal island, church, castle, and civil parish in Cornwall, England in the United Kingdom
 St Mary's Island (Tyne and Wear) – Tidal island in North Tynside, Tyne and Wear, England

Tidal islands of Scotland 
 Baleshare – A flat tidal island in the Outer Hebrides of Scotland
 Bernera, Lismore – A tidal island off Lismore, in Argyll, Scotland
 Black Holm – A small tidal island in the Orkney Islands, near Copinsay to the west of Corn Hol
 Brei Holm – A tiny tidal islet in the western Shetland Islands
 Brough of Birsay – An uninhabited tidal island off the north-west coast of The Mainland of Orkney, Scotland
 Calbha Mor – A tidal islet in Eddrachillis Bay, Sutherland, Scotland.
 Calve Island – An uninhabited island on the east coast of the Isle of Mull in Argyll and Bute on the west coast of Scotland
 Ceann Ear – The largest island in the Monach or Heisgeir group off North Uist in north west Scotland
 Ceann Iar – A tidal island in the Monach Isles, to the west of North Uist in the Outer Hebrides
 Corn Holm – A small tidal island in Orkney, near Copinsay
 Cramond Island – A tidal island in the Firth of Forth in eastern Scotland
 Island of Danna – An inhabited tidal island in Argyll and Bute
 Island Davaar – A tidal island at the mouth of Campbeltown Loch off the east coast of Kintyre, in Argyll and Bute, Scotland.
 Eilean Mòr, Loch Sunart – An uninhabited, tidal island opposite Oronsay at the entrance to Loch Sunart on the west coast of Scotland
 Eilean na Cille – An island of the Outer Hebrides connected to Grimsay (South) by a causeway
 Eilean Shona – A tidal island in Loch Moidart, Scotland
 Eileanan Chearabhaigh – A group of small uninhabited tidal islands off the south east coast of Benbecula in the Outer Hebrides of Scotland
 Eriska – A flat tidal island at the entrance to Loch Creran on the west coast of Scotland
 Erraid – A tidal island to the west of Mull in the Inner Hebrides of Scotland.
 Grimsay – A tidal island in the Outer Hebrides of Scotland
 Grimsay (South East Benbecula) – A tidal island of the Outer Hebrides south east of Benbecula
 Helliar Holm – An uninhabited tidal island off the coast of Shapinsay in the Orkney Islands, Scotland
 Hestan Island – A small tidal island in the Solway Firth, Southwest Scotland
 Huney – An uninhabited tidal island due east of the island of Unst in the Shetland Islands, Scotland
 Inner Holm – A small inhabited tidal island in Stromness harbour and one of the Orkney islands of Scotland
 Islands of Fleet – A group of small islands in Galloway, Scotland. Ardwall and Barlocco are tidal islands
 Isle Ristol – The innermost of the Summer Isles in Scotland,
 Kili Holm – A tidal island in the Orkney Islands, linked to Egilsay
 Lampay – An uninhabited tidal island in Loch Dunvegan, off the northwest coast of the Isle of Skye in Scotland
 Oldany Island – Tidal island in Assynt, Sutherland, north-west Scotland
 Oronsay, Inner Hebrides – A small tidal island south of Colonsay in the Scottish Inner Hebrides
 Oronsay, Loch Bracadale – An uninhabited tidal island in Loch Bracadale on the west coast of Skye, Scotland
 Rough Island, Scotland – Tidal island in the Rough Firth off the Solway Firth in Scotland
 Sanday, Inner Hebrides – A tidal island of the Small Isles, in the Scottish Inner Hebrides
 Sibhinis – A tidal island of the Monach Islands, lying between Ceann Iar and Ceann Ear
 Soay Beag – A small, uninhabited tidal island in West Loch Tarbert, between the northern and southern parts of Harris
 Castle Stalker – Tower house on a tidal islet on Loch Laich, Argyll, Scotland
 Stromay – A tidal island off North Uist in the Sound of Harris, Scotland
 Torsa – A tidal island off North Uist in the Sound of Harris, Scotland
 Uyea, Northmavine – An uninhabited tidal island located to the northwest of Mainland, Shetland
 Vallay – An uninhabited tidal island in the Scottish Outer Hebrides
 West Head of Papa – A small tidal island off Papa in Shetland, one of the Scalloway Islands

Tidal islands of Northern Ireland 
 Nendrum Monastery – Christian monastery on Mahee Island in Strangford Lough, County Down, Northern Ireland

Tidal islands of Wales 
 Burry Holms – A small tidal island at the northern end of the Gower Peninsula, Wales
 Cribinau – A small tidal island off the south west coast of the isle of Anglesey in Wales between Porth China and Porth Cwyfan
 Gateholm – A small tidal island off the south west coast of Pembrokeshire in the south west side of Wales
 Mumbles Head – a headland sited on the western edge of Swansea Bay on the southern coast of Wales
 St Catherine's Island – A small tidal island linked to Tenby in Pembrokeshire, Wales
 Sully Island – A small tidal island off the northern coast of the Bristol Channel near Cardiff
 Ynys Cantwr – A small tidal island south of Ramsey Island, Pembrokeshire, Wales
 Ynys Feurig – A set of three small inter-connected low-lying inshore tidal rocky islets off the west coast of Anglesey, North Wales
 Ynys Gifftan – A tidal island near the south east shore of Traeth Bach, the Dwyryd estuary near Portmeirion in Gwynedd, north Wales
 Ynys Gwelltog – A small tidal island south of Ramsey Island, Pembrokeshire, Wales
 Ynys Llanddwyn – A small tidal island off the west coast of Anglesey, northwest Wales
 Ynys Lochtyn – A tiny tidal island on the coast of Cardigan Bay, Wales near the village of Llangrannog in the county Ceredigion

Tidal islands of the United States 
 Bar Island – A tidal island across from Bar Harbor on Mount Desert Island, Maine, United States
 Bumpkin Island – Tidal island in Massachusetts, United States of America
 Charles Island – Tidal island off the coast of Milford, Connecticut, in Long Island Sound
 Douglas Island – A tidal island in Alaska, just west of downtown Juneau and east of Admiralty Island
 High Island (Bronx) – A small tidal island, part of The Pelham Islands group in the New York City borough of the Bronx
 Sears Island – A tidal island off the coast of Searsport in Waldo County, Maine at the top of Penobscot Bay

Whirlpools 
Whirlpool – Body of rotating water produced by the meeting of opposing currents
 Charybdis – Whirlpool in the Strait of Messina named for a figure in Greek mythology
 Gulf of Corryvreckan – A narrow strait between the islands of Jura and Scarba off the west coast of Scotland with an intense tidal race
 Moskstraumen – A system of tidal eddies and whirlpools that forms at the Lofoten archipelago, Norway
 Naruto whirlpools – Tidal whirlpools in the Naruto Strait in Hyōgo, Japan
 Niagara Whirlpool – A natural whirlpool in the Niagara Gorge, downstream from Niagara Falls
 Old Sow whirlpool – The largest tidal whirlpool in the Western Hemisphere, located off the southwestern shore of Deer Island, New Brunswick, Canada
 Saltstraumen – A small sea strait in Norway with one of the strongest tidal currents in the world
 Skookumchuck Narrows – A strait forming the entrance of Sechelt Inlet on British Columbia's Sunshine Coast in Canada

Waves
Gravity wave – Wave generated in a fluid medium or at the interface between two media when the force of gravity or buoyancy tries to restore equilibrium
 ADCIRC – A high-performance, cross-platform numerical ocean circulation model
 Airy wave theory – A linearised description of the propagation of gravity waves on the surface of a homogeneous fluid layer
 Artificial wave – Man-made waves usually created on a specially designed surface or in a pool
 Ballantine scale – A biologically defined scale for measuring the degree of exposure level of wave action on a rocky shore
 Bow wave – The wave that forms at the bow of a ship when it moves through the water 
 Boussinesq approximation (water waves) – An approximation valid for weakly non-linear and fairly long waves
 Breaking wave – A wave that becomes unstable as a consequence of excessive steepness 
 Capillary wave – Wave traveling along the phase boundary of a fluid, whose dynamics and phase velocity are dominated by the effects of surface tension
 Clapotis – A non-breaking standing wave pattern
 Cnoidal wave – A nonlinear and exact periodic wave solution of the Korteweg–de Vries equation
 Coriolis–Stokes force – A forcing of the mean flow in a rotating fluid due to interaction of the Coriolis effect and wave-induced Stokes drift
 Craik–Leibovich vortex force – A forcing of the mean flow through wave–current interaction
 Cross sea – A sea state with two wave systems traveling at oblique angles
 Dispersion (water waves) – Generally refers to frequency dispersion, which means that waves of different wavelengths travel at different phase speeds
 Douglas sea scale – A scale to estimate the roughness of the sea for navigation
 Draupner wave – A rogue wave which hit the Draupner platform in the North Sea on 1 January 1995
 Edge wave – A surface gravity wave fixed by refraction against a rigid boundary, often a shoaling beach
 Energy cascade – The transfer of energy between large and small scales of motion
 Equatorial Rossby wave – Very long, low frequency waves found near the equator 
 Equatorial waves – Ocean waves trapped close to the equator
 Fetch (geography) – The length of water over which a given wind has blown
 Following sea – A wave direction that matches the heading of a vessel
 Green's law – The evolution of non-breaking surface gravity waves propagating in shallow water of gradually varying depth and width
 Hull speed – The speed at which the wavelength of a vessel's bow wave is equal to the waterline length
 Hundred-year wave – A statistically projected water wave, the height of which, on average, is met or exceeded once in a hundred years for a given location
 Infragravity wave – Surface gravity waves with frequencies lower than the wind waves
 Internal wave – Gravity waves that oscillate within a fluid medium with density variation with depth, rather than on the surface
 Iribarren number – A dimensionless parameter used to model several effects of breaking surface gravity waves on beaches and coastal structures.
 Kelvin wave – A wave in the ocean or atmosphere that balances Coriolis force against a topographic boundary such as a coastline 
 Keulegan–Carpenter number – A dimensionless quantity describing the relative importance of drag and inertia forces for bluff objects in an oscillatory fluid flow
 Langmuir turbulence – A turbulent flow with coherent Langmuir circulation structures that exist and evolve over a range of spatial and temporal scales
 List of rogue waves – Incidents of known and likely rogue waves
 List of waves named after people –
 Kinematic wave – 
 Longshore drift – Sediment moved by the longshore current
 Luke's variational principle – A mathematical description of the motion of surface waves on a fluid with a free surface, under the action of gravity.
 Megatsunami – A very large wave created by a large, sudden displacement of material into a body of water
 Meteotsunami – A tsunami-like wave of meteorological origin
 Mild-slope equation – The combined effects of diffraction and refraction for water waves propagating over variable depth and with lateral boundaries
 Modulational instability, also known as Benjamin–Feir instability – A phenomenon whereby deviations from a periodic waveform are reinforced by nonlinearity 
 Morison equation – a semi-empirical equation for the inline force on a body in oscillatory flow
 Ocean dynamics – The description of the motion of water in the oceans
 Peregrine soliton – An analytic solution of the nonlinear Schrödinger equation
 Radiation stress – The depth-integrated excess momentum flux caused by the presence of the surface gravity waves, which is exerted on the mean flow
 Rogue wave – Relatively large and spontaneous ocean surface waves that occur at sea
 Rossby wave – A type of inertial wave in the atmospheres and oceans of planets that largely owe their properties to rotation of the planet
 Rossby-gravity waves – Equatorially trapped waves that carry energy eastwards
 Sea state – The general condition of the free surface on a large body of water
 Seiche – A standing wave in an enclosed or partially enclosed body of water
 Shallow water equations – A set of partial differential equations that describe the flow below a pressure surface in a fluid
 Significant wave height – The mean wave height of the highest third of the waves
 Sneaker wave – A disproportionately large coastal wave
 Soliton – a self-reinforcing solitary wave packet that maintains its shape while it propagates at a constant velocity
 Stokes boundary layer – The boundary layer close to a solid wall in oscillatory flow of a viscous fluid
 Stokes drift – Average velocity of a fluid parcel in a gravity wave
 Stokes wave – A non-linear and periodic surface wave on an inviscid fluid layer of constant mean depth
 Storm surge – Rise of water surface associated with a low pressure weather system
 Surf break – A permanent obstruction on the seabed which causes waves to break
 Swell (ocean) – A series of waves generated by distant weather systems
 Trochoidal wave – An exact solution of the Euler equations for periodic surface gravity waves
 Tsunami – Series of water waves caused by the displacement of a large volume of a body of water
 Tsunamis in lakes –
 Undertow (water waves) – Return flow below (nearshore) water waves.
 Ursell number – Dimensionless number indicating the nonlinearity of long surface gravity waves on a fluid layer.
 Wake – Region of recirculating flow immediately behind or downstream of a moving or stationary solid body
 Wave action (continuum mechanics) – A conservable measure of the wave part of a motion
 Wave base – The maximum depth at which a water wave's passage causes significant water motion
 Wave height – The difference between the elevations of a crest and a neighbouring trough
 Wave-making resistance – The energy required to push the water out of the way of the hull, which creates the associated waves
 Wave-piercing hull – Hull with a very fine bow with low reserve buoyancy which allows it to pass through the wave with minimum vertical movement
 Wave power – Transport of energy by wind waves, and the capture of that energy to do useful work (technology)
 Wave radar – Technology for measuring surface waves on water
 Wave setup – The increase in mean water level due to the presence of breaking waves
 Wave shoaling – The effect by which surface waves entering shallower water change in wave height
 Wave tank – A laboratory setup for observing the behavior of surface waves
 Wave turbulence – A set of nonlinear waves deviated far from thermal equilibrium.
 Wave–current interaction – The interaction between surface gravity waves and a mean flow
 Waves and shallow water – The effect of shallow water on a surface gravity wave 
 Whitham equation – A non-local model for non-linear dispersive waves
 Wind wave – Surface waves generated by wind that occur on the free surface of bodies of water
 Wind-wave dissipation – The process by which waves generated by a weather system lose their mechanical energy
 Wind wave model – A way to depict the sea state and predict the evolution of the energy of wind waves using numerical techniques

Oceanographical institutions and major projects

Expeditions 
 Albatross expedition – A Swedish oceanographic expedition in 1947 and 1948
 Challenger expedition – Oceanographic research expedition (1872–1876)
 Deepsea Challenger – Deep-diving submersible designed to reach the bottom of Challenger Deep
 Galathea expeditions – A series of three Danish ship-based scientific research expeditions in the 19th, 20th and 21st centuries
 German Meteor expedition – An oceanographic expedition that explored the South Atlantic Ocean from the equatorial region to Antarctica in 1925–192
 Global Ocean Sampling Expedition – An ocean exploration genome project to assess genetic diversity in marine microbial communities
 International Indian Ocean Expedition – A large scale multinational hydrographic survey of the Indian Ocean which took place from 1959 to 1965.
 Malaspina Expedition – A five-year maritime scientific exploration commanded by Alessandro Malaspina and José de Bustamante y Guerra
 Malaspina Expedition 2010 – An interdisciplinary research project to assess the impact of global change on the oceans and explore their biodiversity
 Mission 31 – An undersea expedition organized by Fabien Cousteau in the undersea laboratory Aquarius in the Florida Keys, scuba diving to collect scientific data and IMAX footage
 NOAAS Okeanos Explorer Gulf of Mexico 2017 Expedition – The first of three expeditions on the NOAAS Okeanos Explorer intended to increase the understanding of the deep-sea environment in the Gulf of Mexico
 NOAAS Okeanos Explorer Gulf of Mexico 2018 Expedition – The final of three expeditions on the NOAAS Okeanos Explorer intended to increase the understanding of the deep-sea environment in the Gulf of Mexico
 North Pacific Exploring and Surveying Expedition – A United States scientific and exploring project from 1853 to 1856.
 Siboga expedition – A Dutch zoological and hydrographic expedition to Indonesia from March 1899 to February 1900.
 Snellius Expedition – A Dutch oceanographic expedition in the waters of eastern Indonesia.
 SUPER HI-CAT – Research cruise to study the microbial communities and the biogeochemistry associated with the Great Pacific Garbage Patch
 Valdivia Expedition – A scientific expedition organised and funded by the German Empire under Kaiser Wilhelm II and was named after the ship which was bought and outfitted for the expedition
 The Voyage of the Odyssey – A 5-year program conducted by oceanographic research and education non-profit Ocean Alliance, which collected the first baseline data set on contaminants in the world's oceans

Organisations 

 Association for the Sciences of Limnology and Oceanography – A scientific society
 Bigelow Laboratory for Ocean Sciences – A private, non-profit center for global oceanography, ocean science education, and technology transfer.
 Bureau of Oceans and International Environmental and Scientific Affairs – A bureau within the United States Department of State
 Center for Microbial Oceanography: Research and Education – A research and education organization established in 2006 as a National Science Foundation funded Science and Technology Center
 Centers for Space Oceanography – An operating division of the Argos Foundation, Inc
 Challenger Society for Marine Science – An interdisciplinary learned society of the United Kingdom
 Club of Rome – An organisation of individuals who claim to share a common concern for the future of humanity and strive to make a difference.
 CSIRO Oceans and Atmosphere – A unit of the Commonwealth Scientific and Industrial Research Organisation of Australia
 Flanders Marine Institute – Organization in Flanders, northern Belgium that supports marine research
 Institut für Meereskunde Kiel – German institute for marine sciences
 InterRidge – A non-profit organisation that promotes interdisciplinary, international studies in the research of oceanic spreading centres
 Marine Environmental Data and Information Network – A United Kingdom organization created to curate marine environmental data
 Marine Science Co-ordination Committee – A UK government committee composed of representatives from public-funded bodies who have a remit to undertake marine scientific research
 Marine Technology Society – Professional society in the field of marine technology
 Max Planck Institute for Biogeochemistry – Institute in the Max Planck Society located in Jena, Germany
 National Centers for Environmental Information – Active US archive of environmental data
 National Climatic Data Center – Active US archive of weather data.
 National Oceanographic Partnership Program – American organization
 Observatoire océanologique de Banyuls-sur-Mer – A marine station located in Banyuls-sur-Mer on the Mediterranean coast of France
 Observatoire Oceanologique de Villefranche – A field campus of the Université Paris 6 in Villefranche-sur-Mer on the Côte d'Azur, France
 Ocean Elders – Activist group dedicated to protecting the ocean and its wildlife
 Oceanographic Museum – A museum of marine sciences in Monaco-Ville, Monaco
 Pacific Islands Ocean Observing System – Organisation in US Integrated Ocean Observing System
 Partnership for Observation of the Global Oceans – Organisation
 Station biologique de Roscoff – A French marine biology and oceanography research and teaching centre
 Tsunami Society – A professional society for the research of and dissemination of knowledge about tsunamis

Projects 

 Antarctic Benthic Deep-Sea Biodiversity Project – An international project to investigate deep-water biology of the Scotia and Weddell seas
 Antarctic Technology Offshore Lagoon Laboratory – A floating oceanographic laboratory for in situ observation experiments
 Argo (oceanography) – International oceanographic observation program
 Atlantic Meridional Transect – A multi-decadal oceanographic programme that undertakes biological, chemical and physical research during annual voyages between the UK and destinations in the South Atlantic
 BENGAL (project) – A three-year multidisciplinary study of the abyssal benthic boundary layer in the northeast Atlantic
 Bermuda Atlantic Time-series Study – A long-term oceanographic study by the Bermuda Institute of Ocean Sciences
 Biogeography of Deep-Water Chemosynthetic Ecosystems – Project to determine the biogeography and understand the processes driving these systems
 British Mid-Ocean Ridge Initiative – A multidisciplinary scientific investigation of the creation of the Earth's crust in the deep oceans.
 British Oceanographic Data Centre – A national facility for conserving and distributing data about the marine environment
 CLIWOC – A research project to convert ships' logbook weather data into a computerised database
 Coastal-Marine Automated Network – A meteorological observation network along the coast of the United States
 Community Earth System Model – A fully coupled numerical simulation of Earth systems
 Coriolis (project) – A joint oceanographic project of seven French institutes
 Deep Sea Drilling Project – Ocean drilling research program between 1966 and 1983
 Defying Ocean's End – A global agenda for action in marine conservation
 Discovery Investigations – A series of scientific cruises and shore-based investigations into the biology of whales in the Southern Ocean
 European Consortium for Ocean Research Drilling – A consortium of 14 European countries and Canada that was formed in 2003 to join the Integrated Ocean Drilling Program
 European Multidisciplinary Seafloor and water column Observatory – A large-scale European distributed Research Infrastructure for ocean observation
 Expocode – A unique alphanumeric identifier for cruise labels of research vessels to avoid confusion in oceanographic data management.
 FESOM – A multi-resolution ocean general circulation model that solves the equations of motion describing the ocean and sea ice using finite-element and finite-volume methods on unstructured computational grids
 Finite Volume Community Ocean Model – A prognostic, unstructured-grid, free-surface, 3-D primitive equation coastal ocean circulation model
 General Bathymetric Chart of the Oceans – A publicly available bathymetric chart of the world's oceans
 General circulation model – A type of climate model that uses the Navier–Stokes equations on a rotating sphere with thermodynamic terms for various energy sources
 Geochemical Ocean Sections Study – A global survey of the three-dimensional distributions of chemical, isotopic, and radiochemical tracers in the ocean
 Geotraces – International research programme to improve understanding of biogeochemical cycles in the oceans
 Glacio-geological databases – Data on glacially associated sedimentary deposits and erosion activity from former and current ice-sheets
 Global Drifter Program – Collecting measurements of surface ocean currents, sea surface temperature and sea-level atmospheric pressure using drifters
 Global Historical Climatology Network – A database of temperature, precipitation and pressure records
 Global Ocean Data Analysis Project – A synthesis project bringing together oceanographic data
 Global Ocean Ecosystem Dynamics – A core project for understanding how global change will affect the abundance, diversity and productivity of marine populations
 Global Ocean Observing System – A global system for sustained observations of the ocean comprising the oceanographic component of the Global Earth Observing System of Systems
 Hawaii Ocean Time-series – A long-term oceanographic study based at the University of Hawaii at Manoa
 Hotspot Ecosystem Research and Man's Impact On European Seas – An international multidisciplinary project that studies deep-sea ecosystems
 Hotspot Ecosystems Research on the Margins of European Seas – An international multidisciplinary project that studied deep-sea ecosystems along Europe's deep-ocean margin
 IMBER – International project for marine research
 Ocean acidification in the Great Barrier Reef – Project?
 Index to Marine & Lacustrine Geological Samples – A collaboration between twenty institutions and agencies that operate geological sample repositories
 Integrated Ocean Drilling Program – Marine research program between 2003–2013 to monitor and sample sub-seafloor environments
 International Ocean Discovery Program – An international marine research collaboration for drilling, coring, and monitoring the subseafloor
 Joint Global Ocean Flux Study – An international research programme on the fluxes of carbon between the atmosphere and ocean, and within the ocean interior
 Integrated Ocean Observing System – An organization of systems that routinely and continuously provides quality controlled data and information on current and future states of the oceans and Great Lakes
 List of ocean circulation models – A list of ocean circulation models, as used in physical oceanography.
 MIT General Circulation Model – A numerical computer method that solves the equations of motion for the ocean or atmosphere using the finite volume method
 Model for Prediction Across Scales – A coupled Earth system modelling package that integrates atmospheric, oceanographic and cryospheric modelling on a variety of scales
 Modular Ocean Model – A three-dimensional ocean circulation model for studying the ocean climate system
 Monterey Accelerated Research System – A cabled-based observatory system below the surface of Monterey Bay
 MyOcean – A series of projects granted by the European Commission to set up a pan-European capacity for ocean monitoring and forecasting
 National Oceanographic Data Center – One of the national environmental data centers operated by the National Oceanic and Atmospheric Administration
 NOBM – NASA Ocean Biogeochemical Model is a three-dimensional representation of coupled circulation/biogeochemical/radiative processes in the global oceans
 Nucleus for European Modelling of the Ocean – A general model of ocean circulation developed by a European consortium
 Ocean Drilling Program – Marine research program between 1985 and 2003
 Ocean general circulation model – Model to describe physical and thermodynamic processes in oceans
 Ocean observations – List of currently feasible essential observations for climate research
 Ocean Observatories Initiative – A program that focuses the work of an emerging network of science driven ocean observing systems
 Ocean Surface Topography Mission – International Earth observation satellite mission
 Operation Highjump – United States Navy operation to establish an Antarctic research base
 Operation Windmill – US Navy Antarctica expedition
 OceanoScientific – A programme to study climate change at the ocean-atmosphere interface
 Parallel Ocean Program – A three-dimensional ocean circulation model designed primarily for studying the ocean climate system
 POLYGON experiment – An experiment in oceanography conducted in middle of the Atlantic Ocean during the 1970s
 Precontinent – Undersea research habitat in the Red Sea
 Prediction and Research Moored Array in the Atlantic – A system of moored observation buoys in the tropical Atlantic Ocean which collect meteorological and oceanographic data
 Princeton ocean model – 
 Project Kaisei – Project to study and clean up the Great Pacific Garbage Patch
 Project Mohole – Attempt in the early 1960s to drill through the Earth's crust into the Mohorovičić discontinuity
 Project Vamp – US Navy project to survey Virginia and Massachusetts shores
 Rapid Climate Change-Meridional Overturning Circulation and Heatflux Array – A collaborative research project in the North Atlantic Ocean
 Regional Ocean Modeling System – A free-surface, terrain-following, primitive equations ocean model
 Research Moored Array for African-Asian-Australian Monsoon Analysis and Prediction – A system of moored observation buoys in the Indian Ocean that collects meteorological and oceanographic data
 SCICEX – Research program involving a collaboration between the U.S. Navy and academic researchers
 SeaDataNet – An international project of oceanography to enable the scientific community to access historical datasets owned by national data centers
 Simple Ocean Data Assimilation – An oceanic re-analysis data set consisting of gridded state variables for the global ocean
 SOCCOM project – Project to increase the understanding of the Southern Ocean
 Station P (ocean measurement site) – A geographically located ocean measurement site
 Tropical Atmosphere Ocean project – A major international effort that instrumented the tropical Pacific Ocean with deep ocean moorings
 World Ocean Atlas – A data product of the Ocean Climate Laboratory of the National Oceanographic Data Center (U.S.)
 World Ocean Circulation Experiment –
 United States Navy use of Hydrometer 1800s – Historical use of the measuring equipment
 United States Exploring Expedition – An exploring and surveying expedition, 1838 to 1842
 World Ocean Circulation Experiment – A component of the international World Climate Research Program
 World Ocean Database Project – An international collection of ocean profile-plankton data
 World Ocean Review – An extensive report, dealing with the state of the world ocean, the interactions between the ocean and ecological, economical and sociopolitical conditions

History of oceanography 

 Aethiopian Sea – The name given to the southern part of the Atlantic Ocean in classical geographical works

Oceanography awards 
 A.G. Huntsman Award for Excellence in the Marine Sciences – Medal awarded by the Royal Society of Canada
 Alexander Agassiz Medal – Medal awarded by the U.S. National Academy of Sciences for an original contribution in the science of oceanography
 Hans Hass Award – Award in recognition of contribution made to the advancement of our knowledge of the ocean
 Henry Stommel Research Award – Medallion awarded by the American Meteorological Society to researchers in the dynamic and physics of the ocean
 International Meteorological Organization Prize – Annual award of the World Meteorological Organization in the fields of meteorology and operational hydrology
 Ramón Margalef Award for Excellence in Education – Educational award in the fields of limnology and oceanography
 Sverdrup Gold Medal Award – Award by the American Meteorological Society for contributions regarding interactions between the oceans and the atmosphere

Politics, laws and activism 
 Oceans Act of 2000 – US law to establish policy on the oceans
 United States Commission on Ocean Policy – A US commission to establish findings and recommendations for a national ocean policy

Persons influential in oceanography 

 Chris Freeman (scientist) – British biochemist, Professor at Bangor University
 Philip Froelich – An American academic oceanographic scientist
 Thomas J. Goreau – A biogeochemist and marine biologist
 Edward Brinton – American academic oceanographer and biologist
 John Francon Williams – A Welsh writer, geographer, historian, journalist, cartographer and inventor
 E. Virginia Armbrust – A biological oceanographer
 James Johnstone (biologist) – Scottish biologist and oceanographer (1870–1932)

Hydrodynamicists

Marine geologists 
Marine geology – The study of the history and structure of the ocean floor
 Tanya Atwater – American geophysicist and marine geologist
 John V. Byrne – American marine geologist and academic
 Peter Clift – British marine geologist and geophysicist
 Robert S. Dietz – American marine geologist, geophysicist and oceanographer
 Robert F. Dill – American marine geologist
 Robert Dolan (marine geologist) – American geologist (1929–2016)
 Liviu Giosan – Romanian and American marine geologist
 William W. Hay – American marine geologist, micropaleontologist, paleoceanographer, and paleoclimatologist
 Hartmut Heinrich – German marine geologist and climatologist
 Hans Holtedahl – Norwegian geologist
 Eystein Jansen – Norwegian marine geologist and paleoceanographer
 Maria Klenova – Russian and Soviet marine geologist
 Steven Kuehl – American marine geologist
 Drummond Matthews – British marine geologist and geophysicist
 Larry Mayer – American geophysicist and marine geologist
 Henry William Menard – American geologist
 John Milliman – American marine geologist
 Maureen Raymo – American paleoclimatologist and marine geologist
 Ivan Rosenqvist – Norwegian marine geologist
 Hassan Nasiem Siddiquie – Indian marine geologist
 Frederick Vine – English marine geologist and geophysicist
 Wang Pinxian – Chinese marine geologist

Journals 

 African Journal of Marine Science – A peer-reviewed scientific journal covering all disciplines of marine science
 Annual Review of Marine Science – An annual peer-reviewed scientific review journal published by Annual Reviews
 Bulletin of Marine Science – A peer-reviewed scientific journal published by the Rosenstiel School of Marine and Atmospheric Science of the University of Miami
 Estuarine, Coastal and Shelf Science – A peer-reviewed academic journal on ocean sciences, with a focus on coastal regions ranging from estuaries up to the edge of the continental shelf.
 ICES Journal of Marine Science – A peer-reviewed scientific journal covering oceanography and marine biology. It is published by Oxford University Press on behalf of the International Council for the Exploration of the Sea
 Journal of Applied Ichthyology – A peer-reviewed scientific journal on ichthyology, marine biology, and oceanography published by Wiley-Blackwell
 Journal of Atmospheric and Oceanic Technology – A scientific publication by the American Meteorological Society
 Journal of Geophysical Research: Oceans – A peer-reviewed scientific journal managed by the American Geophysical Union.
 Journal of Physical Oceanography – A peer-reviewed scientific journal published by the American Meteorological Society.
 Marine and Petroleum Geology – A peer-reviewed scientific journal
 Marine Geology – A peer-reviewed scientific journal
 Ocean Science – An open-access peer-reviewed scientific journal published by Copernicus Publications on behalf of the European Geosciences Union
 Oceanography – A quarterly peer-reviewed scientific journal published by the Oceanography Society
 Paleoceanography – A peer-reviewed scientific journal published by the American Geophysical Union
 Polar Science – A quarterly peer-reviewed scientific journal covering research related to the polar regions of the Earth and other planets
 Scientia Marina – A peer-reviewed academic journal on marine research published by Institut de Ciències del Mar de Barcelona

External links 

Oceanography
Oceanography
Oceanography